This is a list of films and miniseries that are based on actual events. All films on this list are from American production unless indicated otherwise.

Not all films have remained true to the genuine history of the event or the characters they are portraying, often adding action and drama to increase the substance and popularity of the film. True story films gained popularity in the late 1980s and early 1990s, with the production of films based on actual events that first aired on CBS, ABC, and NBC. This list should only include films supported by a Wikipedia article.

1890s 
 The Execution of Mary Stuart (1895) – 18-second film produced by Thomas Edison, using trick photography to portray the execution of Mary, Queen of Scots
 King John (1899) – about the life of the medieval king, based on the play by William Shakespeare
 Major Wilson's Last Stand (1899) – British silent short war film dramatizing the final engagement of the Shangani Patrol and the death of Major Allan Wilson and his men in Rhodesia in 1893
 The Dreyfus Affair (French: L'affaire Dreyfus) (1899) – silent films reconstructing episodes from the trial of Alfred Dreyfus

1900s 
 Joan of Arc (French: "Jeanne d'Arc") (1900) – French silent film based on the life of Joan of Arc
 Capital Execution (Danish: Henrettelsen) (1903) – Danish silent film telling the true story of a French woman who is condemned to death for killing her two children
 The Story of the Kelly Gang (1906) – follows the life of the legendary bushranger Ned Kelly, often cited as the first full-length feature film
 Eureka Stockade (1907) – Australian silent film about the Eureka Rebellion
 The Unwritten Law (1907) – true crime film, about Harry Kendall Thaw's killing of Stanford White over his involvement with model and actress Evelyn Nesbit.
 La Mort du duc de Guise (1908) – about the murder of Henry I, Duke of Guise, in 1588
 The Boston Tea Party (1908) – film made at the Edison Studios about the Boston Tea Party of 1773

1910s 
 Davy Crockett (1910) – loosely based on the frontiersman Davy Crockett
 Peg Woffington (1910) – about the actress Peg Woffington
 Saved from the Titanic (1912) – about the sinking of the RMS Titanic starring Dorothy Gibson, an actual survivor of the Titanic.
 David Garrick (1913) – about the actor David Garrick
 Sixty Years a Queen (1913) – about the life and reign of Queen Victoria of the United Kingdom 
 The Adventures of François Villon (1914) – based on the life of François Villon
 The Indian Wars Refought (1914) – reconstruction of major battles from the Indian Wars of the American West.
 Barbara Frietchie (1915) – based on the life of Barbara Fritchie
 Jane Shore (1915) – based on the life of Jane Shore
 The Prince and the Pauper (1915) – based on the novel by Mark Twain about King Edward VI of England
 The Blacklist (1916) –  silent drama film based on the 1915 Colorado miners strike
 The Mutiny of the Bounty (1916) – Australian-New Zealander silent film about the mutiny aboard . 
 Nurse Cavell (1916) – Australian film about the execution of Nurse Edith Cavell in the previous year 
 The Black Stork (1917) – written by and starring Harry J. Haiselden, the chief surgeon at the German-American Hospital in Chicago. The Black Stork is Haiselden's fictionalized account of his eugenic infanticide of the child John Bollinger
 The Trooper of Troop K (1917) – drama war film based on a black U.S. Army cavalry unit in the early 1900s
 Het proces Begeer (1918) – Dutch silent drama film and based on the true story of three criminals who prepare a robbery on the diamond company of the firm Begeer in Amsterdam
 Ravished Armenia (1919) – about the Armenian genocide based on the account of survivor Aurora Mardiganian, who also played the lead role in the film

1920s

1920 
 Anna Boleyn (1920) – German film about Anne Boleyn
 Catherine the Great (1920) – German film about Catherine the Great, empress of Russia
 Countess Walewska (1920) – German film about Napoleon and Marie Walewska
 The Dancer Barberina (1920) – German film about Frederick the Great and Barberina Campanini
 Within Our Gates (1920) – silent race film portrays the contemporary racial situation in the United States during the early twentieth century, the years of Jim Crow, the revival of the Ku Klux Klan, the Great Migration of blacks to cities of the North and Midwest, and the emergence of the "New Negro"

1921 
 The Gunsaulus Mystery (1921) – silent race film inspired by events and figures in the 1913-1915 trial of Leo Frank for the murder of Mary Phagan
 Jánošík (1921) – Slovak film about the popular legend of the highwayman Juraj Jánošík
 Orphans of the Storm (1921) – silent drama film set in late-18th-century France, before and during the French Revolution
 The Queen of Shebe (1921) – silent drama film about the story of the ill-fated romance between Solomon, King of Israel, and the Queen of Sheba

1922 
 A Prince of Lovers (1922) –  British silent biographical film portraying the life of the British writer Lord Byron
 Cocaine (1922) – British crime film depicting the distribution of cocaine by gangsters through a series of London nightclubs and was reportedly based on real-life criminal Brilliant Chang
 Der Graf von Essex (1922) – German silent historical film about Graf Essex
 The Loves of Pharaoh (1922) – German historical epic film about Pharaoh Amenemope
 Nanook of the North (1922) – silent docudrama following the lives of an Inuk, Nanook, and his family as they travel, search for food, and trade in the Ungava Peninsula of northern Quebec, Canada
 Nero (1922) – American-Italian silent historical film portraying the life of the Roman Emperor Nero
 Rob Roy (1922) – British silent historical film depicting the life of the early 18th century outlaw Rob Roy MacGregor

1923 
 Bonnie Prince Charlie (1923) – British silent historical film depicting the Jacobite Rebellion of 1745 and its aftermath when the Jacobite pretender Charles Edward Stuart evaded capture by the forces loyal to the Hanoverians
 I.N.R.I. (1923) – German silent religious epic film depicting a retelling of the events leading up to the crucifixion of Jesus Christ
 The Loves of Mary, Queen of Scots (1923) – British silent historical film depicting the life of Mary, Queen of Scots, and her eventual execution
 Our Hospitality (1923) –  silent comedy film displaying satire of the real-life Hatfield–McCoy feud
 Salomé (1923) – silent film which is a loose retelling of the biblical story of King Herod and his execution of John the Baptist

1924 
 America (1924) – Silent historical war romance film based on the heroic story of the events during the American Revolutionary War, in which filmmaker D. W. Griffith created a film adaptation of Robert W. Chambers' 1905 novel The Reckoning
 Beau Brummel (1924) – Silent historical drama film depicting the life of the British Regency dandy Beau Brummell 
 Claude Duval (1924) – British silent adventure film based on the historical story of Claude Duval

1925 
 Battleship Potemkin (Russian: Бронено́сец Потёмкин) (1925) – Soviet silent drama film presenting a dramatization of the mutiny that occurred in 1905 when the crew of the Russian battleship Potemkin rebelled against its officers
 The Goose Woman (1925) – silent drama film based in part on the then already sensational Hall-Mills murder case.
 The Hussar of Death (Spanish: El Húsar de la Muerte) (1925) – Chilean silent biographical film based on the adventures of the guerrilla leader Manuel Rodríguez during the Reconquista, until his death in 1818.
 Prem Sanyas (The Light of Asia) (1925) – Weimar-Indian silent film based on the life of Prince Siddhartha Gautama, who founded Buddhism by becoming the Buddha or the "Enlightened one"
 Tumbleweeds (1925) – Silent western film depicting the Cherokee Strip land rush of 1893

1926 
 The Captain from Köpenick (German: Der Hauptmann von Köpenick) (1926) – German silent film based on the case of Wilhelm Voigt
 The General (1926) – Silent film inspired by the Great Locomotive Chase, a true story of an event that occurred during the American Civil War
 The Great K & A Train Robbery (1926) – Silent western film based on the actual foiling of a train robbery by Dick Gordon
 The Johnstown Flood (1926) – Silent epic drama film that addresses the Great Flood of 1889 in Johnstown, Pennsylvania
 Nelson (1926) – British historical film about Admiral Horatio Nelson 
 Secrets of a Soul (German: Geheimnisse einer Seele) (1926) – German silent drama film based on the works and theories of Sigmund Freud

1927 
 The Beloved Rogue (1927) – Silent romantic adventure film, loosely based on the life of the 15th century French poet, François Villon
 The Chess Player (French: Le Joueur d'échecs) (1927) – French silent film based on the story of the chess-playing automaton known as The Turk
 Chicago (1927) – Silent film based on the 1926 play Chicago by Maurine Dallas Watkins, which was inspired by the stories of Belva Gaertner and Beulah Annan, jazz babies on death row; remade in 1942 and 2002
 The Club of the Big Deed (Russian: Союз Великого дела) (1927) – Soviet silent historical drama film about the 1825 Decembrist revolt.
 The End of St. Petersburg (Russian: Конец Санкт-Петербурга) (1927) – Soviet silent film depicting the Bolsheviks' rise to power in 1917
 The King of Kings (1927) – Silent epic film depicting the last weeks of Jesus before his crucifixion
 Madame Pompadour (1927) – British silent historical drama film depicting the life of Madame Pompadour, mistress of Louis XV of France
 Mata Hari (German: Mata Hari, die rote Tänzerin) (1927) – German silent drama film depicting the life and death of the German World War I spy Mata Hari
 Napoléon (1927) – French silent epic historical film telling the story of Napoleon's early years 
 October: Ten Days That Shook the World (Russian: Октябрь (Десять дней, которые потрясли мир) (1927) – Soviet silent historical film depicting a dramatization of the 1917 October Revolution commissioned for the tenth anniversary of the event

1928 
 Dawn (1928) – British silent war film based on the story of World War I martyr Edith Cavell
 The Divine Woman (1928) – Silent film loosely based on stories of the early life of the French actress Sarah Bernhardt
 Madame Récamier (1928) – French silent film about the life of Juliette Récamier
 Maria Marten (1928) – British silent drama film based on the real story of the Red Barn Murder in the 1820s
 The Passion of Joan of Arc (French: La Passion de Jeanne d'Arc) (1928) – French silent historical film based on the actual record of the trial of Joan of Arc

1929 
 Cagliostro (1929) – German silent drama film based on the life of the eighteenth century Italian occultist Alessandro Cagliostro, portraying him more sympathetically than in most other works
 Disraeli (1929) – pre-Code historical film revolving around the British plan to buy the Suez Canal and the efforts of two spies to stop it
 The Miraculous Life of Thérèse Martin (French: La Vie miraculeuse de Thérèse Martin) (1929) – French silent film depicting biographical account of the late 19th century Discalced Carmelite nun who died at age 24 from tuberculosis and was canonized in 1925
 Ludwig II, King of Bavaria (German: Ludwig der Zweite, König von Bayern) (1929) – German silent historical film portraying the life and reign of the monarch Ludwig II who ruled Bavaria from 1864 to 1886
The Queen's Necklace (French: Le collier de la reine) (1929) – French historical drama film about the Affair of the Diamond Necklace which occurred before the French Revolution
 The Royal Box (German: Die Königsloge) (1929) – historical film about the life of the British actor Edmund Kean

1930s

1930 
 Abraham Lincoln (1930) – Pre-Code biographical film about Abraham Lincoln
 Dreyfus (1930) – German drama film chronicling the Dreyfus affair
 The Loves of Robert Burns (1930) – British historical musical film depicting the life of the Scottish poet Robert Burns

1931 
 Alexander Hamilton (1931) –  Pre-Code biographical film about Alexander Hamilton
 Comradeship (German: Kameradschaft) (1931) – French-German drama film concerning a mine disaster where German miners rescue French miners from an underground fire and explosion. The story takes place in the Lorraine–Saar regions, along the border between France and Germany
 Dreyfus (1931) – British drama film depicting the Dreyfus affair
 Road to Life (Russian: Putyovka v zhizn) (1931) – Soviet drama film in which hundreds of orphans are sent to a labor commune
 The Theft of the Mona Lisa (German: Der Raub der Mona Lisa) (1931) – German drama film based on the 1911 real robbery

1932 
 I Am a Fugitive from a Chain Gang (1932) – Pre-Code crime-drama film based on the stroy of a wrongfully convicted man on a chain gang who escapes to Chicago 
 Pergolesi (1932) – Italian historical musical film portraying the brief life of the eighteenth century Italian composer Giovanni Battista Pergolesi
 Rasputin and the Empress (1932) – Pre-Code film set in Imperial Russia during the last years of the reign of Czar Nicholas II and the Czarina Alexandra
 Silver Dollar (1932) – Pre-Code biographical film depicting the story of the rise and fall of Horace Tabor (renamed Yates Martin), a silver tycoon in 19th century Colorado

1933 
 Night Flight (1933) – pre-Code aviation drama film based on the 1931 novel of the same name which follows aviator Antoine de Saint-Exupéry's personal experiences while flying on South American mail routes
 The Private Life of Henry VIII (1933) – the story of King Henry VIII

1934 
 Cleopatra (1934) – retelling of the story of Cleopatra VII
 The Man They Could Not Hang (1934) – Australian film about the life of John Babbacombe Lee, whose story had been filmed previously in 1912 and 1921
 Waltzes from Vienna (1934) – biographical musical of composer Johann Strauss II

1935 
 Murder in Harlem (1935) – race film basing the works on the 1913 trial of Leo Frank for the murder of Mary Phagan
 Mutiny on the Bounty (1935) – first Hollywood depiction of the mutiny-at-sea tale, with Clark Gable and Charles Laughton

1936 
 The Great Ziegfeld (1936) – story of Florenz Ziegfeld Jr.
 The Prisoner of Shark Island (1936) – story of Samuel Mudd
 San Francisco (1936) – hurly-burly of the Barbary Coast, quickly quashed by the infamous 1906 San Francisco earthquake

1937 
 Black Legion (1937) – crime drama film. A fictionalized treatment of the historic Black Legion of the 1930s in Michigan
 The Life of Emile Zola (1937) – story of the Dreyfus affair

1938 
 Alexander Nevsky (1938) – Soviet historical war film about Prince Alexander Nevsky
 Boys Town (1938) – story of Edward J. Flanagan
 In Old Chicago (1938) – retelling of The Great Chicago Fire
 Marie Antoinette (1938) – based on the life of Marie Antoinette, from her betrothal to Louis XVI, through her reign as the last queen of France, to her execution
 Pietro Micca (1938) – Italian historical war film portraying the life and death of Pietro Micca, who was killed in 1706 at the Siege of Turin while fighting for the Duchy of Savoy against France in the War of the Spanish Succession
 Frontier Marshal (1939) – story of Wyatt Earp

1939 
 Gjest Baardsen (1939) – Norwegian film based on the life of the outlaw Gjest Baardsen, but it is a blend of fact and fiction. The plot is taken from a chapbook published by Holger Sinding under the pseudonym Halle Sira
 Juarez (1939) – story of Mexican President Benito Juarez
 The Story of Alexander Graham Bell (1939) – biographical film about Alexander Graham Bell, inventor of the telephone
 Young Mr. Lincoln (1939) – the future president (portrayed by Henry Fonda) finds success as a lawyer, and finds himself a wife (played by Marjorie Weaver)

1940s

1940 
 Abe Lincoln in Illinois (1940) – story of President Abraham Lincoln
 Edison, the Man (1940) – in flashback, 50 years after inventing the light bulb, an 82-year-old Thomas Edison tells his story beginning at age 22 with his arrival in New York
 The Fighting 69th (1940) – war film based upon the actual exploits of New York City's 69th Infantry Regiment during World War I. The regiment was given that nickname when opposing General Robert E. Lee during the American Civil War
 Pastor Hall (1940) – British drama film based on the true story of the German pastor Martin Niemöller who was sent to Dachau concentration camp for criticizing the Nazi Party
 Santa Fe Trail (1940) – story of J.E.B. Stuart and his mission to stop John Brown
 The Three Codonas (1940) – German drama film based on the life of the circus performer Alfredo Codona
 Young Tom Edison (1940) – a chronicle of inventor Thomas Edison's boyhood, showing him as a lad whose early inventions and scientific experiments frequently end in disastrous results, until a life-or-death event in his home town redeems him and his ideas

1941 
 The 47 Ronin (Japanese: Genroku Chūshingura) (1941) – black-and-white two-part jidaigeki Japanese film about the legendary Forty-seven rōnin and their plot to avenge the death of their lord, Asano Naganori, by killing Kira Yoshinaka, a shogunate official responsible for Asano being forced to commit seppuku
 Beatrice Cenci (1941) – Italian historical drama film portraying the story of the sixteenth century Italian noblewoman Beatrice Cenci
 Citizen Kane (1941) – inspired by true events in the life of publisher William Randolph Hearst
 Sergeant York (1941) – Alvin York, a pacifist from the Tennessee hills, becomes the most decorated American soldier of World War I; Gary Cooper won the Academy Award for Best Actor in the film directed by Howard Hawks
 They Died with Their Boots On (1941) – story of George Armstrong Custer

1942 
 General von Döbeln (1942) – biopic of Lieutenant General and war hero Georg Carl von Döbeln
 The Pride of the Yankees (1942) – based on NY Yankees first baseman, Lou Gehrig
 Tennessee Johnson (1942) – story of President Andrew Johnson
 They Flew Alone (1942) – British biopic about aviator Amy Johnson
 Yankee Doodle Dandy (1942) – story of George M. Cohan, the actor, singer, dancer, playwright, songwriter, producer, theatre owner, director, and choreographer known as "The Man Who Owns Broadway"

1943 
 Guadalcanal Diary (1943) – World War II war film based on the book of the same name by Richard Tregaskis. The film recounts the fight of the United States Marines in the Battle of Guadalcanal, which occurred only a year before the movie's release
 Klondike Kate (1943) – Western film set in Alaska during the Klondike Gold Rush of the 1890s, it is loosely based on the story of Klondike Kate
 Seeing Hands (1943) – short film telling the story of Benjamin Charles Helwig, who was blinded in his late teens but became a valued employee at an American World War II manufacturing plant, machining and inspecting precision parts
 The Song of Bernadette (1943) – account of Bernadette Soubirous who reported seeing visions of the Blessed Virgin Mary in Lourdes, France

1944 
 The Adventures of Mark Twain (1944) – story of author Mark Twain
 Buffalo Bill (1944) – story of folk hero and showman Buffalo Bill Cody
 The Great Moment (1944) – biographical film based on the book Triumph Over Pain (1940) by René Fülöp-Miller, it tells the story of Dr. William Thomas Green Morton, a 19th-century Boston dentist who discovered the use of ether for general anesthesia
 The Rats of Tobruk (1944) – Australian war film following three drover friends who enlist in the Australian Army together during World War II. Their story is based on the siege of the Libyan city of Tobruk in North Africa by Rommel's Afrika Korps
 Thirty Seconds Over Tokyo (1944) – war film based on the 1943 book of the same name by Captain Ted W. Lawson. Lawson was a pilot on the historic Doolittle Raid, America's first retaliatory air strike against Japan, four months after the attack on Pearl Harbor
 Wilson (1944) – story of President Woodrow Wilson
 Wing and a Prayer, The Story of Carrier X (1944) – black-and-white war film about the heroic crew of an American carrier in the desperate early days of World War II in the Pacific theater. It is partially based on historic events, partially a propaganda movie

1945 
 Captain Kidd (1945) – story of Captain William Kidd
 Dillinger (1945) – gangster film and film noir telling the story of John Dillinger
 The House on 92nd Street (1945) – black-and-white spy film and film noir about Bill Dietrich, who becomes a double agent for the FBI in a Nazi spy ring
 Objective, Burma! (1945) – war film loosely based on the six-month raid by Merrill's Marauders in the Burma Campaign during the Second World War
 Pride of the Marines (1945) – biographical war film telling the story of U.S. Marine Al Schmid in World War II, his heroic stand against a Japanese attack during the Battle of Guadalcanal, in which he was blinded by a grenade, and his subsequent rehabilitation
 Scotland Yard Investigator (1945) – crime film, following the outbreak of the Second World War the Mona Lisa is moved to a London gallery for safekeeping, where a German art collector attempts to steal it. The film was a loose sequel to Republic's 1944 thriller Secrets of Scotland Yard with a number of the same cast and crew
 Stairway to Light (1945) – short drama film. It was one of John Nesbitt's Passing Parade series. Set in Paris during the French Revolution, it tells the story of Philippe Pinel and his efforts in pointing out that the mentally ill should not be treated as animals

1946 
 Dr. Kotnis Ki Amar Kahani (1946) – Indian film based on the life of Dwarkanath Kotnis, an Indian doctor who worked in China during the Japanese invasion in World War II
 Jericho (1946 film) (1946) – French war film based on Operation Jericho
 The Jolson Story (1946) – loosely based on the life of singer Al Jolson, played by Larry Parks
 Magnificent Doll (1946) – drama film about Dolley Madison, the daughter of boardinghouse owners in Washington, DC who falls in love with Aaron Burr and James Madison 
 My Darling Clementine (1946) – story of Wyatt Earp
 Night and Day (1946) – loosely based on the life of songwriter Cole Porter, played by Cary Grant
 Sister Kenny (1946) – biographical film about Sister Elizabeth Kenny, an Australian nurse who treated victims of polio, starring Rosalind Russell
 Till the Clouds Roll By (1946) – loosely based on the life of songwriter Jerome Kern, with an all-star cast including Sinatra, Garland, and Lena Horne
 Utamaro and His Five Women (1946) – based on the life of Japanese artist Kitagawa Utamaro

1947 
 Boomerang (1947) – based on the true story of a vagrant accused of murder, only to be found innocent through the efforts of the prosecutor
 The Love of the Actress Sumako (1947) – black-and-white Japanese film portraying the life story of Sumako Matsui, one of Japan's first female actresses, and her affair with her director

1948 
 The Babe Ruth Story (1948) – film biography of Babe Ruth, played by William Bendix
 Call Northside 777 (1948) – documentary-style film noir based on the true story of a Chicago reporter who proved that a man imprisoned for murder was wrongly convicted
 He Walked by Night (1948) – police procedural film noir loosely based on newspaper accounts of the real-life actions of Erwin "Machine-Gun" Walker, a former Glendale, California, police department employee and World War II veteran who unleashed a crime spree of burglaries, robberies, and shootouts in the Los Angeles area in 1945 and 1946
 Macbeth (1948) – about Macbeth from Shakespeare's play of the same name
 Man to Men (French: D'homme à hommes) (1948) – French/Swiss co-production about the founding of the Red Cross
 Operation Swallow: The Battle for Heavy Water (Norwegian: Kampen om tungtvannet) (1948) – Norwegian-French film based on the best known commando raid in Norway during World War II, where the resistance group Norwegian Independent Company 1 destroyed the heavy water plant at Vemork in Telemark in February 1943
 Scott of the Antarctic (1948) – depicts Robert Falcon Scott's ill-fated Terra Nova Expedition and his attempt to be the first to reach the South Pole

1949 
 Battleground (1949) – war film that follows a company in the 327th Glider Infantry Regiment, 101st Airborne Division as they cope with the Siege of Bastogne during the Battle of the Bulge, in World War II
 Come to the Stable (1949) – tells the true story of the Abbey of Regina Laudis and the two French religious sisters who come to a small New England town and involve the townsfolk in helping them to build a children's hospital
 Doctor Laennec (1949) – based on the life of René Laennec
 Du Guesclin (1949) – based on the life of Bertrand du Guesclin
 Jolson Sings Again (1949) – sequel to The Jolson Story (1946), again starring Larry Parks as Al Jolson
 Kampen mod uretten (1949) – Danish drama film about Peter Sabroe's fight for the well-being of children
 Lost Boundaries (1949) – based on William Lindsay White's story of the same title, a nonfiction account of Dr. Albert C. Johnston and his family, who passed for white while living in New England in the 1930s and 1940s
 The Secret of Mayerling (French: Le secret de Mayerling) (1949) – French film about the 1889 Mayerling Incident
 Special Agent (1949) – film noir crime film, loosely based on the DeAutremont Brothers 1923 train robbery

1950s

1950 
 Annie Get Your Gun (1950) – musical Technicolor comedy film loosely based on the life of sharpshooter Annie Oakley
 Cheaper by the Dozen (1950) – Technicolor film based upon the autobiographical book Cheaper by the Dozen (1948) by Frank Bunker Gilbreth Jr. and Ernestine Gilbreth Carey. The film and book describe growing up in a family with twelve children, in Montclair, New Jersey
 Madeleine (1950) – based on a true story of Madeleine Smith, a young Glasgow woman from a wealthy family who was tried in 1857 for the murder of her lover, Emile L'Angelier
 Sending of Flowers (French: Envoi de fleurs) (1950) – starting Tino Rossi as the composer Paul Delmet
 The Sound of Fury (1950) – crime film and film noir based on the 1947 novel The Condemned, which was based on events that occurred in 1933, when two men were arrested in San Jose, California, for the kidnap and murder of Brooke Hart
 Three Came Home (1950) – based on the memoirs of the same name by writer Agnes Newton Keith. It depicts Keith's life in North Borneo in the period immediately before the Japanese invasion in 1942, and her subsequent internment and suffering, separated from her husband Harry, and with a young son to care for
 The Wooden Horse (1950) – story of an escape by three officers from Stalag Luft III, who all successfully made it to England
 Young Man with a Horn (1950) – inspired by the life of self-taught cornetist Bix Beiderbecke, who set new standards in jazz but succumbed to alcoholism at age 28, a tragedy that the movie replaced with a happy ending

1951 
 A Place in the Sun (1951) – update of Dreiser's An American Tragedy, in which Chester Gillette was executed for drowning his pregnant girlfriend
 Appointment with Venus (1951) – based on the evacuation of Alderney cattle from the Channel Islands during World War II
 The Axe of Wandsbek (German: Das Beil von Wandsbek) (1951) – East German film about Hamburg's executioner who falls ill in 1934 and turns to a butcher to kill the perpetrators
 The Desert Fox (1951) – German general Erwin Rommel evades the Allies in North Africa, but not the Gestapo back home
 The Franchise Affair (1951) – British thriller film. It is a faithful adaptation of the novel The Franchise Affair by Josephine Tey. Though set in a contemporary (post-Second World War) setting, it is inspired by the 18th-century case of Elizabeth Canning, a maidservant who claimed she had been kidnapped and held prisoner for a month
 Fourteen Hours (1951) – film noir drama which tells the story of a New York City police officer trying to stop a despondent man from jumping to his death from the 15th floor of a hotel. Based on an article by Joel Sayre in The New Yorker describing the 1938 suicide of John William Warde
 The Frogmen (1951) – black-and-white World War II drama film based on operations by United States Navy Underwater Demolition Teams, popularly known as "frogmen", against the Japanese Army and naval forces
 Go for Broke! (1951) – black-and-white war film dramatizing the real-life story of the 442nd, which was composed of Nisei (second-generation Americans born of Japanese parents) soldiers
 The Great Missouri Raid (1951) – Western film about James–Younger Gang, a 19th-century gang of American outlaws 
 I'll See You in My Dreams (1951) – the story of legendary lyricist Gus Khan, one of the most prolific songwriters of the 20th century
 The Red Inn (French: L'auberge rouge) (1951) – French comedy-crime film set in 1833, it tells the story of how a monk visits the inn l'Auberge rouge in Peyrebeille, where the innkeeper confesses to a number of serious sins. The film is based on the actual crime case of the Peyrebeille Inn

1952 
 5 Fingers (1952) – James Mason plays Cicero, a World War II-era spy in Ankara, Turkey, and the highest-paid spy in history
 Angels One Five (1952) – British war film centering on a young fighter pilot immediately before and during the Battle of Britain in the Second World War
 Bwana Devil (1952) – adventure B movie based on the true story of the Tsavo maneaters 
 Carbine Williams (1952) – drama film following the life of David Marshall Williams, who invented the operating principle for the M1 Carbine while in a North Carolina prison. The M1 Carbine was used extensively during World War II and Korea
 Casque d'Or (1952) – French film loosely based on an infamous love triangle between the prostitute Amélie Élie and the Apache gang leaders Manda and Leca, which was the subject of much sensational newspaper reporting during 1902
 Gift Horse (US as Glory at Sea) (1952) – the second half of the movie is based on what is known as "The Greatest Raid of All" which was to blow up the dock at St Nazaire by slamming it with an explosive loaded ship in World War II; starring Trevor Howard and Richard Attenborough
 In the Name of the Law (Turkish: Kanun namina) (1952) – Turkish drama film based on real events regarding a love triangle that led to homicide, that took place in Istanbul, in the following years of World war II
 The Iron Mistress (1952) – starring Alan Ladd as Jim Bowie. It ends with Bowie's marriage to Ursula de Veramendi and does not deal with his death at the Battle of the Alamo in 1836
 The Lawless Breed (1952) – Technicolor Western film based on the life of outlaw John Wesley Hardin
 The Mistress of Treves (1952) – French-German-Italian co-production about the legendary Genevieve of Brabant, set during the Crusades
 Moulin Rouge (1952) – John Huston's colorful film about the artist Henri de Toulouse-Lautrec
 Red Shirts (1952) – French-Italian co-production about Anita Garibaldi, starring Anna Magnani
 Rome 11:00 (Italian: Roma, ore 11) (1952) – Italian film based on an accident that happened on 15 January 1951 on Via Savoia in Rome when a staircase collapsed because of the weight of two hundred women waiting for a job interview
 The Story of Will Rogers (1952) – story of Will Rogers
 Walk East on Beacon (1952) – film noir drama about the meeting of German physicist and atomic spy Klaus Fuchs and American chemist Harry Gold as well as details of the Soviet espionage network in the United States. Gold's testimony would later lead to the case against Julius and Ethel Rosenberg for treason

1953 
 Albert R.N. (1953) – the true story of British prisoners-of-war who make a dummy, "Albert", which they use at roll call to trick German guards
 Anatahan (1953) – black-and-white Japanese film war drama about twelve Japanese seamen who, in June 1944, are stranded on an abandoned-and-forgotten island called An-ta-han for seven years
 Calamity Jane (1953) – Technicolor western musical film loosely based on the life of Wild West heroine Calamity Jane
 Gate of Hell (Japanese: Jigokumon) (1953) – Japanese jidaigeki film telling the story of a samurai who tries to marry a woman he rescues, only to discover that she is married
 Hell Raiders of the Deep (Italian: I sette dell'Orsa maggiore) (1953) – Italian film based on the events of the Raid on Alexandria in 1941 by frogmen of the Decima Flottiglia MAS human torpedoes
 Houdini (1953) – fanciful account of the life of magician and escapologist Harry Houdini
 The President's Lady (1953) – story of President Andrew Jackson
 The Secret of Blood (Czech: Tajemství krve) (1953) – Czechoslovak biographical drama film about Czech doctor Jan Janský who discovered and classified the four different blood types
 Titanic (1953) – about the RMS Titanic
 War Arrow (1953) – Technicolor Western film based on the Seminole Scouts

1954 
 Drum Beat (1954) – CinemaScope western film, the story uses elements of the 1873 Modoc War in its narrative, with a white man asked by the U.S. Army to attempt negotiations with Native Modocs who are about to wage war
 The Glenn Miller Story (1954) – story of bandleader Glenn Miller
 John Wesley (1954) – British historical film depicting the life of the father of Methodism, John Wesley
 King Richard and the Crusaders (1954) – historical drama film based on Sir Walter Scott's 1825 novel The Talisman
 The Law vs. Billy the Kid (1954) – Western film starring Scott Brady as Billy the Kid
 Madame du Barry (1954) – French-Italian historical drama film depicting the life of Madame du Barry, mistress to Louis XV in the eighteenth century
 Napoléon (1954) – French historical epic film depicting major events in the life of Napoleon Bonaparte
 Queen Margot (1954) – French film with Jeanne Moreau as Marguerite de Valois
 Rasputin (1954) – French-Italian historical drama film portraying the rise and fall of the Russian priest and courtier Grigori Rasputin

1955 
 A Man Called Peter (1955) – drama film based on the life of preacher Peter Marshall, who served as Chaplain of the United States Senate and pastor of the New York Avenue Presbyterian Church in Washington, D. C., before his early death
 Above Us the Waves (1955) – British war film about human torpedo and midget submarine attacks in Norwegian fjords against the German battleship Tirpitz
 The Cockleshell Heroes (1955) – Technicolor war film depicting a heavily fictionalized version of Operation Frankton, the December 1942 raid on German cargo shipping by British Royal Marines, when Special Boat Service commandos infiltrated Bordeaux Harbour using folding kayaks
 The Colditz Story (1955) – prisoner of war film based on the book written by Pat Reid, an Escape Officer for British POWs imprisoned in Oflag IV-C, Colditz Castle in Germany during WW II
 The Dam Busters (1955) – depiction of Operation Chastise, technically challenging raids against German dams in World War II, which required the development of "bouncing bombs"
 The Eternal Sea (1955) – after an American naval officer loses his leg at the Battle of Leyte Gulf, he resists attempts to retire him and continues in the service after learning to cope with his disability. He goes on to be promoted to admiral and commands an aircraft carrier during the Korean War
 The Girl in the Red Velvet Swing (1955) – fictionalized story of Evelyn Nesbit, a model and actress who became embroiled in the scandal surrounding the June 1906 murder of her paramour, architect Stanford White, by her husband, rail and coal tycoon Harry Kendall Thaw
 Land of the Pharaohs (1955) – Epic historical drama film loosely based on the story of the building of the Great Pyramid
 The Night Holds Terror (1955) – crime film noir, based on a criminal kidnapping wealthy family man Gene Courtier 
 The Night My Number Came Up (1955) – British supernatural drama film based on a real incident in the life of British Air Marshal Sir Victor Goddard
 Road to Life (Russian: Pedagogicheskaya poema) (1955) – Soviet drama film based on the book by Anton Makarenko
 Sardar (1955) – based on the life of Sardar Vallabhbhai Patel, one of India's greatest nationalists and the first Home Minister of India
 Seven Angry Men (1955) – biopic on the life of abolitionist John Brown
 Seven Cities of Gold (1955) – historical adventure DeLuxe Color film telling the story of the eighteenth-century Franciscan priest, Father Junípero Serra and the founding of the first missions in what is now California
 To Hell and Back (1955) – biographical film in which Audie Murphy, America's most decorated soldier, played himself at the studio's urging, although Murphy wanted Tony Curtis for the role

1956 
 A Man Escaped (French: Un condamné à mort s'est échappé ou Le vent souffle où il veut) (1956) – French film based on the memoirs of André Devigny, a member of the French Resistance held in Montluc prison by the occupying Germans during World War II
 The Battle of the River Plate (1956) – British war film about the hunt for the German pocket battleship Graf Spee
 Beatrice Cenci (1956) – Italian historical drama film based on Beatrice Cenci, a young Roman noblewoman who murdered her abusive father, Count Francesco Cenci
 The Benny Goodman Story (1956) - based on the life of famed jazz clarinetist and bandleader Benny Goodman
 The Conqueror (1956) – story of Genghis Khan
 Death of a Scoundrel (1956) – a fictionalized adaptation of the life and mysterious death of Serge Rubinstein
 Der Teufelskreis (1956) – East German film about the Reichstag fire trial
 The Great Locomotive Chase (1956) – adventure film based on the real Great Locomotive Chase that occurred in 1862 during the American Civil War
 The King and I (1956) – musical film based on the 1951 Richard Rodgers and Oscar Hammerstein II musical The King and I, based in turn on the 1944  novel Anna and the King of Siam by Margaret Landon. That novel in turn was based on memoirs written by Anna Leonowens, who became school teacher to the children of King Mongkut of Siam in the early 1860s. Leonowens' stories were autobiographical, although various elements of them have been called into question
 Lust for Life (1956) – biographical film about force-of-nature painter Vincent van Gogh, played by Kirk Douglas
 The Man Who Never Was (1956) – 1956 British  espionage thriller film based on the book of the same name by Lt. Cmdr. Ewen Montagu and chronicles Operation Mincemeat, a 1943 British intelligence plan to deceive the Axis powers into thinking the Allied invasion of Sicily would take place elsewhere in the Mediterranean
 Marie Antoinette Queen of France (French: Marie-Antoinette reine de France) (1956) – French film about Marie Antoinette, the last queen of France before the French Revolution
 Miracle of the White Suit (Spanish: Un traje blanco) (1956) – Italian-Spanish drama film about poor seven year old Marcos who wants his First Communion in a white suit
 Somebody Up There Likes Me (1956) – based on the life and career of middleweight boxing champion Rocky Graziano, starring Paul Newman
 The Trapp Family (German: Die Trapp-Familie) (1956) – West German comedy drama film about the real-life Austrian musical family of that name
 The Wrong Man (1956) – Alfred Hitchcock film with Henry Fonda portraying a man wrongly accused of armed robbery

1957 
 All Mine to Give (1957) – Technicolor melodrama film. When first one parent, then the other dies, six children have to look after themselves. Based on a true-life story set in Wisconsin, based on an article "The Day They Gave Babies Away" by Dale Eunson and his wife, Katherine Albert, which first appeared in the December 1946 issue of Cosmopolitan
 The Buster Keaton Story (1957) – the life of actor Buster Keaton
 The Crucible (French: Les Sorcières de Salem, German: Die Hexen von Salem or Hexenjagd) (1957) – Franco-East German film set in Salem, Massachusetts, 1692, around Abigail, seduced and abandoned by John Proctor, who accuses John's wife of being a witch in revenge
 The Devil Strikes at Night (German: Nachts, wenn der Teufel kam) (1957) – West German film based on the true story of serial killer Bruno Lüdke
 Gunfight at the O.K. Corral (1957) – story of Wyatt Earp
 Ill Met by Moonlight (1957) – British film based on the 1950 book Ill Met by Moonlight: The Abduction of General Kreipe by W. Stanley Moss, which is an account of events during the author's service on Crete during World War II as an agent of the Special Operations Executive (SOE)
 Man of a Thousand Faces (1957) – the life of silent film actor Lon Chaney, the child of deaf-mute parents, played by James Cagney
 Nine Lives (Norwegian: Ni liv) (1957) – Norwegian film about Resistance hero Jan Baalsrud
 Portland Exposé (1957) – film noir based on Jim Elkins, ringleader of a crime syndicate in Portland, Oregon
 Queen Louise (1957) – German film starring Ruth Leuwerik as Louise of Mecklenburg-Strelitz
 Slaughter on Tenth Avenue (1957) – film noir crime film based on the non-fiction book The Man Who Rocked the Boat, an autobiography by William Keating, that chronicles Keating's experiences as an assistant district attorney and as counsel to the New York City Anti-Crime Committee
 The Spirit of St. Louis (1957) – depiction of Charles Lindbergh's first solo flight across the Atlantic in 1927, with James Stewart as "Lucky Lindy"
 The Three Faces of Eve (1957) – CinemaScope drama–mystery film adaptation based on a book by psychiatrists Corbett H. Thigpen and Hervey M. Cleckley. Based on their case of Chris Costner Sizemore, also known as Eve White, a woman they suggested might suffer from dissociative identity disorder (multiple personality disorder)
 The Wings of Eagles (1957) – Metrocolor film based on the life of Frank "Spig" Wead and the history of U.S. Naval aviation from its inception through World War II
 Yangtse Incident: The Story of H.M.S. Amethyst (1957) – the story of HMS Amethyst; a war film telling the story of a British frigate caught up in the Chinese Civil War

1958 
 A Night to Remember (1958) – documentary-style retelling of the Titanics demise, from the 1955 book by Walter Lord
 Battle of the V-1 (1958) – British war film based on the novel They Saved London (1955), by Bernard Newman, in which a Polish Resistance group discovers details of the manufacture of the German V-1 'Flying Bomb' at Peenemünde in 1943 
 The Buccaneer (1958) – heavily fictionalized version of how the privateer Lafitte helped in the Battle of New Orleans and how he had to choose between fighting for America or for the side most likely to win, the United Kingdom
 The Case Against Brooklyn (1958) – film noir crime film based on a True Magazine article I Broke the Brooklyn Graft Scandal by crime reporter Ed Reid
 Confess, Doctor Corda (German: Gestehen Sie, Dr. Corda) (1958) – West German crime film about a doctor who's wrongly convicted for murdering a young woman in a park at night
 Der eiserne Gustav (1958) – German comedy based on the real story of cab driver Gustav Hartmann who drove his droshky from Berlin to Paris
 H-8 (1958) – Yugoslav film about the collision of a bus and a truck on a two-lane road between Zagreb and Belgrade
 I Want to Live! (1958) – heavily fictionalized story of Barbara Graham, convicted of murder and facing execution
 I Was Monty's Double (1958) – based on the autobiography of M. E. Clifton James, who pretended to be General Montgomery as part of a campaign of disinformation during World War II
 The Inn of the Sixth Happiness (1958) – the story of Gladys Aylward, rescuing Chinese orphaned children
 Machine-Gun Kelly (1958) – film noir chronicling the criminal activities of the real-life George "Machine Gun" Kelly
 Orders to Kill (1958) – British wartime drama film based on a story by Donald Chase Downes, a former American intelligence operative who also acted as technical adviser to the film
 Rosemary (German: Das Mädchen Rosemarie) (1958) – West German drama film portraying the scandal that surrounded Rosemarie Nitribitt
 Too Much, Too Soon (1958) – the unfortunate story of Diana Barrymore, daughter of John Barrymore, based on her autobiography
 The Trapp Family in America (German: Die Trapp-Familie in Amerika) (1958) – West German comedy drama about the Austrian musical Trapp Family, a sequel to the 1956 film The Trapp Family
 The Two-Headed Spy (1958) – British spy thriller film with elements of film noir, set in the Second World War, and based on a story by J. Alvin Kugelmass called Britain's Two-Headed Spy

1959 
 Al Capone (1959) – biographical crime drama film starring Rod Steiger as Al Capone
 Anatomy of a Murder (1959) – courtroom drama crime film based on the 1958 novel of the same name written by Michigan Supreme Court Justice John D. Voelker under the pen name Robert Traver. Voelker based the novel on a 1952 murder case in which he was the defense attorney
 Beloved Infidel (1959) – story of F. Scott Fitzgerald
 Compulsion (1959) – based on the murder committed by Leopold and Loeb and the subsequent trial
 The Diary of Anne Frank (1959) – based on the play of the same name, which was in turn based on the diary of Anne Frank
 The Five Pennies (1959) – semi-biographical film starring Danny Kaye as cornet player and bandleader Red Nichols
 General Della Rovere (Italian: Il generale della Rovere) (1959) – Italian film based on a novel by Indro Montanelli
 Hannibal (Italian: Annibale) (1959) – Italian historical adventure film based on the life of Hannibal
 The Horse Soldiers (1959) – adventure war western film set during the American Civil War loosely based on Harold Sinclair's 1956 novel of the same name, a fictionalized version of Grierson's Raid in Mississippi
 Inside the Mafia (1959) – film noir crime film based on the Albert Anastasia murder and subsequent Apalachin Meeting
 Love Now, Pay Later (German: Die Wahrheit über Rosemarie) (1959) – West German drama film inspired by the life and death of Rosemarie Nitribitt
 Pork Chop Hill (1959) – Korean War film based upon the book by U.S. military historian Brigadier General S. L. A. Marshall. It depicts the first fierce Battle of Pork Chop Hill between the U.S. Army's 7th Infantry Division and Chinese and North Korean forces in April 1953
 Ten Ready Rifles (Spanish: Diez fusiles esperan) (1959) – Spanish drama film concerning the Carlist Wars of the 19th century
 The White Warrior (Italian: Agi Murad, il diavolo bianco) (1959) – Italian adventure film loosely based on Lev Tolstoy's novel Hadji Murat

1960s

1960 
 Cleopatra's Daughter (1960) – Italian historical drama film set in Egypt during the reign of the pharaoh Khufu
 Exodus (1960) – epic film on the founding of the modern State of Israel, based on the 1958 novel Exodus by Leon Uris
 The Flesh and the Fiends (1960) – British horror film about 19th-century medical doctor Robert Knox, who purchases human corpses for research from a murderous pair named Burke and Hare
 The Great Impostor (1960) – based on the true story of an impostor named Ferdinand Waldo Demara.  The film is loosely based on Robert Crichton's 1959 biography of the same name, but only loosely follows Demara's real-life exploits, and is much lighter in tone than the book on which it is based
 Hell to Eternity (1960) – World War II film about the true experiences of Marine hero Pfc. Guy Gabaldon, a Los Angeles Hispanic boy raised in the 1930s by a Japanese American foster family, and his heroic actions during the Battle of Saipan
 Inherit the Wind (1960) – dramatization of the 1925 Scopes "Monkey" Trial
 Mughal-e-Azam (1960) – Indian epic historical drama film about Emperor Akbar.
 Oscar Wilde (1960) – the story of Oscar Wilde
 Psycho (1960) – inspired by the crimes of the real-life serial killer Ed Gein
 The Rise and Fall of Legs Diamond (1960) – neo-noir crime film centered around Irish American gangster Jack "Legs" Diamond 
 The Siege of Sidney Street (1960) – British historical drama film dramatizing the 1909 Tottenham Outrage and the 1911 Siege of Sidney Street
 Sink the Bismarck! (1960) – the behemoth Bismarck is wanted by the Royal Navy after sinking their prized battlecruiser  and is chased throughout the North Atlantic before being bombarded and sent to the bottom in May 1941
 Spartacus (1960) – Stanley Kubrick's epic treatment of the Roman slave revolt known as the Third Servile War in 73 B.C.
 Ten Who Dared (1960) – the story of John Wesley Powell's 1869 expedition down the Colorado River
 The Trials of Oscar Wilde (1960) – the story of Oscar Wilde

1961 
 Bridge to the Sun (1961) – based on the 1957 autobiography Bridge to the Sun by Gwen Terasaki, which detailed events in Teraski's life and marriage
 Constantine and the Cross (Italian: Costantino il grande) (1961) – Italian/Yugoslav historical drama film about the early career of the emperor Constantine, who first legalized and then adopted Christianity in the early 4th century
 Duel of the Titans (Italian: Romolo e Remo) (1961) –  Italian / French film based on the legend of Romulus and Remus 
 El Cid (1961) – a highly romanticized story of the life of the Castilian knight El Cid
 Greyfriyars Bobby (1961) – based on the true story of a dog who sleeps on its recently deceased owner's grave every night in an Edinburgh churchyard.
 Judgment at Nuremberg (1961) – Spencer Tracy portrays an American judge in Nuremberg in 1948, assigned to preside over the trial of four German judges, each allegedly guilty of war crimes, charged with having abused the court system to help cleanse Nazi Germany of the politically and socially undesirable
 Kappalottiya Thamizhan (1961) – Indian Tamil film based on the life of V. O. Chidambaram Pillai
 King of the Roaring 20's: The Story of Arnold Rothstein (1961) – biopic, drama, crime film depicting the gangster Arnold Rothstein rising to be a major figure in the criminal underworld during the prohibition era, it was based on a book by Leo Katcher
 Mad Dog Coll (1961) – heavily fictionalized treatment of the life of Vincent "Mad Dog" Coll Curran, who was born in 1908 in County Donegal, Ireland

1962 
 Axel Munthe, The Doctor of San Michele (German: Axel Munthe – Der Arzt von San Michele) (1962) – O.W. Fischer plays Swedish doctor Axel Munthe
 Birdman of Alcatraz (1962) – Burt Lancaster portrays convicted murderer Robert Stroud
 The Counterfeit Traitor (1962) – William Holden stars as World War II spy Eric Erickson, whose life view is broadened by the woman he loved, played by Lilli Palmer
 Escape from East Berlin – based on an actual escape that took place on January 28, 1962
 Geronimo (1962) – Technicolor Western film loosely following the events leading up to the final surrender of Geronimo during the Apache-United States conflict in 1886
 Gypsy (1962) – musical about the relationship between legendary stripper Gypsy Rose Lee and her irrepressible stage mother, adapted from the Broadway show, which was in turn based on Lee's memoir
 Jeder stirbt für sich allein (1962) – West German made for television political drama film based on a best-selling 1947 novel by Hans Fallada, itself based on the true story of a working class couple, Otto and Elise Hampel, who committed acts of civil disobedience against the government of Nazi Germany and were executed
 Lawrence of Arabia (1962) – David Lean's epic about T. E. Lawrence
 Lo smemorato di Collegno (1962) – commedia all'italiana film loosely based on the Bruneri-Canella case
 The Longest Day (1962) – depiction of D-Day, the invasion of Normandy on June 6, 1944, during World War II
 Merrill's Marauders (1962) – Technicolor war film based on the exploits of the long-range penetration jungle warfare unit of the same name in the Burma campaign, culminating in the Siege of Myitkyina
 The Miracle Worker (1962) – the story of blind and deaf humanitarian Helen Keller and her teacher, the titular Annie Sullivan
 Mutiny on the Bounty (1962) – a retelling of the famous mutiny
 No Man Is an Island (1962) – war film about the exploits of George Ray Tweed, a United States Navy radioman who avoided capture and execution by the Japanese during their years-long World War II occupation of Guam
 The Password Is Courage (1962) – a somewhat blasé version of the exploits of British Sergeant-Major Charles Coward, a POW in World War II; he was bizarrely awarded the Iron Cross and also smuggled himself into Auschwitz and gave testimony at the Nuremberg Trials; starring Dirk Bogarde, with a cameo appearance by Coward
 Salvatore Giuliano (1962) – Italian film shot in a neo-realist documentary, non-linear style, it follows the lives of those involved with the famous Sicilian bandit Salvatore Giuliano
 The Silent Raid (Dutch: De overval) (1962) – Dutch war film about the raid on Leeuwarden prison of December 8, 1944
 Ten Italians for One German (Italian: Dieci italiani per un tedesco (Via Rasella)) (1962) – Italian historical war drama film dramatizing the Fosse Ardeatine massacre
 The Trial of Joan of Arc (French: Procès de Jeanne d'Arc) (1962) – French historical film about Joan of Arc
 The Valiant (1962) – British/Italian international co-production film based on the Italian manned torpedo attack which seriously damaged the two British battleships Valiant and Queen Elizabeth and the oil tanker Sagona at the port of Alexandria in December 1941

1963 
 America America (1963) – drama film directed, produced and written by Elia Kazan, adapted from his own book, published in 1962. Inspired by the life of his uncle, Avraam Elia Kazantzoglou
 Cleopatra (1963) – chronicles the struggles of Cleopatra VII, the young Queen of Egypt, to resist the imperialist ambitions of Rome
 Dr. Crippen (1963) – British biographical film concerning the real-life Edwardian doctor Hawley Harvey Crippen, who was hanged in 1910 for the murder of his wife
 The Great Escape (1963) – Allied prisoners attempt a mass, 175-man breakout of Stalag Luft III; 76 escape
 Johnny Shiloh (1963) – television film that originally aired as two episodes of The Wonderful World of Disney based on the life of John Clem, who was called "Johnny Shiloh"
 Ladybug Ladybug (1963) – a commentary on the psychological effects of the Cold War, the title deriving from the classic nursery rhyme, the film was inspired by a McCall's magazine story about an actual incident at an elementary school
 Miracle of the White Stallions (1963) – about the evacuation of the Lipizzaner horses from the Spanish Riding School in Vienna during World War II
 Naked Among Wolves (German: Nackt unter Wölfen) (1963) – East German film based on author Bruno Apitz's 1958 novel by the same name
 PT 109 (1963) – U.S. President John F. Kennedy's exploits and heroism as captain of the ill-fated patrol boat, cut in half by a Japanese destroyer during World War II
 The Sadist (1963) – first feature film loosely based on the teenage serial killers Charles Starkweather and his girlfriend Caril Ann Fugate
 The Windows of Heaven (1963) – about Lorenzo Snow, the fifth president of the Church of Jesus Christ of Latter-day Saints (LDS Church)
 Yeh Rastey Hain Pyar Ke (1963) – Hindi film based on the 1958 murder case KM Nanavati v State of Maharashtra

1964 
 Becket (1964) – historical drama about the changing relationship between King Henry II of England and Thomas Becket who became Archbishop of Canterbury
 Black Like Me (1964) – drama film based on the 1961 book Black Like Me by John Howard Griffin. The journalist disguised himself to pass as an African-American man for six weeks in 1959 in the Deep South to report on life in the segregated society from the other side of the color line
 The Fall of the Roman Empire (1964) – epic film loosely based on actual historical events during the fall of the Western Roman Empire
 The Unsinkable Molly Brown (1964) – musical Metrocolor film based on the book of the 1960 musical The Unsinkable Molly Brown by Richard Morris. The plot is a fictionalized account of the life of Margaret Brown, who survived the 1912 sinking of the 
 Zulu (1964) – historical war film depicting the Battle of Rorke's Drift between the British Army and the Zulus in January 1879

1965 
 The Agony and the Ecstasy (1965) – dramatization of conflicts between Michelangelo and Pope Julius II during the painting of the ceiling of the Sistine Chapel
 Atentát ( The Assassination) (1965) – black-and-white Czechoslovak war film depicting World War II events before and after the assassination of top German leader Reinhard Heydrich in Prague (Operation Anthropoid)
 Battle of the Bulge (1965) – based on the last major German offensive campaign of World War II
 The Great Race (1965) – Technicolor slapstick comedy film inspired by the actual 1908 New York to Paris Race
 The Greatest Story Ever Told (1965) – epic film, a retelling of the Biblical account about Jesus of Nazareth, from the Nativity through to the Ascension
 Harlow (1965) – biographical film about the life of film star Jean Harlow
 Operation Crossbow (1965) – highly fictionalized account of the real-life Operation Crossbow in the last years of World War II
 Shakespeare-Wallah (1965) – loosely based on the real-life actor-manager Geoffrey Kendal's family and his travelling "Shakespeareana Company", which earned him the Indian sobriquet "Shakespearewallah", the film follows the story of nomadic British actors as they perform Shakespeare plays in towns in post-colonial India
 The Sound of Music (1965) – the story of the Von Trapp family, with Julie Andrews as the young woman who leaves an Austrian convent to become a governess to a widowed naval officer's seven children

1966 
 Alvarez Kelly (1966) – Western film set in the American Civil War, based on the historic Beefsteak Raid of September 1864 led by Confederate Major General Wade Hampton III
 Black Girl (French: La noire de…) (1966) – French–Senegalese film centering on Diouana, a young Senegalese woman, who moves from Dakar, Senegal to Antibes, France to work for a rich French couple
 The Battle of Algiers (Italian: La battaglia di Algeri) (1966) – Italian/Algerian historical war film based on events during the Algerian War (1954–62) against French colonial rule in North Africa, the most prominent being the titular Battle of Algiers
 Born Free (1966) – based on the true events with Joy and George Adamson, a real-life couple who raised Elsa the Lioness, an orphaned lion cub, to adulthood, and released her into the wilderness of Kenya
 Cast a Giant Shadow (1966) – the life of Colonel Mickey Marcus, who volunteered to help Israel in the war of independence

1967 
 Bonnie and Clyde (1967) – a highly romanticized story of outlaw couple Clyde Barrow and Bonnie Parker
 Det største spillet ( The Greatest Gamble) (1967) – Norwegian war drama telling the story about Norwegian resistance member Gunvald Tomstad, and his experience as a double agent during World War II
 The Diary of Anne Frank (1967) – TV film based on the book The Diary of a Young Girl by Anne Frank
 Hour of the Gun (1967) – about the aftermath of the Gunfight at the O.K. Corral
 In Cold Blood (1967) – the account of the Clutter family murder in 1959 Kansas, adapted from Truman Capote's book of the same name
 Robbery (1967) – heavily fictionalized version of the 1963 Great Train Robbery
 The St. Valentine's Day Massacre (1967) – based on the true events leading to the 1929 murder of seven mob associates of the North Side gang, led by Al Capone's South Side gang

1968 
 Anzio (Italian: Lo sbarco di Anzio) (1968) – Italian and American co-production Technicolor war film about Operation Shingle, the 1944 Allied seaborne assault on the Italian port of Anzio in World War II. It was adapted from the book Anzio by Wynford Vaughan-Thomas
 Black Jesus (Italian: Seduto alla sua destra) (1968) – Italian drama film inspired by the final days of the first Prime Minister of the Democratic Republic of the Congo Patrice Lumumba
 The Boston Strangler (1968) – Tony Curtis plays Albert DeSalvo, convicted and imprisoned for the Boston area "Green Man" rapes and suspected of the murders of 13 women from 1962 through 1964
 The Charge of the Light Brigade (1968) – British film about the Crimean War and the events leading up to the charge of the Light Brigade, an event immortalized by the 1854 poem by Alfred, Lord Tennyson
 The Devil's Brigade (1968) – war film based on the 1966 book of the same name co-written by American novelist and historian Robert H. Adleman and Col. George Walton, a member of the brigade
 Femme Fatale, Jang Hee-bin (Korean: Yohwa Jang Huibin) (1968) – South Korean film, King Sukjong assigns Jang Ok-nan, a court lady, as a concubine overnight. Jang plots to drive the current queen into exile 
 Isadora (1968) – biographical film of the American dancer Isadora Duncan
 The Lion in Winter (1968) – historical film dramatizing Henry II's decision to name a successor to the English throne and his conflicts with his estranged wife, Eleanor of Aquitaine, and sons
 Mayerling (1968) – romantic tragedy film based on the novels Mayerling by Claude Anet and L'Archiduc by Michel Arnold and the 1936 film Mayerling, which dealt with the real-life Mayerling Incident
 Yours, Mine and Ours (1968) – loosely based on the story of Frank and Helen Beardsley

1969 
 Anne of the Thousand Days (1969) – the story of Anne Boleyn, the second wife of Henry VIII and mother of the future queen of England, Elizabeth I
 Battle of Britain (1969) – the dogfights between the Royal Air Force and the Luftwaffe, resulting in the failure of Hitler's Operation Sea Lion
 Battle of Neretva (1969) – based on the events of the Battle of the Neretva in 1943
 Beatrice Cenci (1969) – historical drama about Italian noblewoman Beatrice Cenci who sets up a plan to murder her abusive father
 The Bridge at Remagen (1969) – war film based on the nonfiction book The Bridge at Remagen: The Amazing Story of March 7, 1945 by writer and U. S. Representative Ken Hechler
 Butch Cassidy and the Sundance Kid (1969) – an account of an outlaw pair who flee the closing Old West for greener pastures in Bolivia
 Jackal of Nahueltoro (Spanish: El Chacal de Nahueltoro) (1969) – Chilean drama film about the real story of Jorge del Campo Valenzuela, a farmer, who from childhood is the victim of abuse and labored exploitation
 The Red Tent (Russian: Krasnaya palatka) (1969) – Soviet/Italian film based on the story of the 1928 mission to rescue Umberto Nobile and the other survivors of the crash of the airship Italia
 Ring of Bright Water (1969) – loosely based on Gavin Maxwell's autobiographical book of the same name, about his life with pet otters in Scotland
 Tell Them Willie Boy Is Here (1969) – Technicolor western film based on the true story of a Chemehuevi–Paiute Indian named Willie Boy and his run-in with the law in 1909 in Banning, California, United States
 Z (1969) – Algerian-French political thriller film, based on the 1966 novel of the same name by Vassilis Vassilikos. The film presents a thinly fictionalized account of the events surrounding the assassination of democratic Greek politician Grigoris Lambrakis in 1963

1970s

1970 
 A Baltic Tragedy (Swedish: Baltutlämningen) (1970) – Swedish drama film based on the Swedish extradition of Baltic soldiers that took place between 1945 and 1946
 A Bullet for Pretty Boy (1970) – action film about gangster Pretty Boy Floyd
 Airport (1970) – based on the Continental Airlines Flight 11 suicide bombing
 Bloody Mama (1970) – low-budget drama film very loosely based on the real story of Ma Barker, who is depicted as a corrupt mother who encourages and organizes her children's criminality
 Chisum (1970) – western film loosely based on events and characters from the Lincoln County War of 1878 in the New Mexico Territory, which involved historical figures John Chisum, (1824-1884), Pat Garrett (1850–1908), and Billy the Kid (1859–1881) among others
 Corbari (1970) – Italian war film based on real life events of Italian partisan Silvio Corbari
 Cromwell (1970) – British historical drama film, based on the life of Oliver Cromwell, who led the Parliamentary forces during the English Civil War
 The Cross and the Switchblade (1970) – crime film about David Wilkerson and Nicky Cruz
 The Diane Linkletter Story (1970) – 16mm short film based on the 1969 suicide of TV personality Art Linkletter's daughter, Diane
 Dreams of Love - Liszt (Hungarian: Szerelmi álmok – Liszt) (1970) – Hungarian-Soviet film based on the life of Hungarian composer and pianist Franz Liszt
 The Honeymoon Killers (1970) – crime film about American serial killer couple Raymond Fernandez and Martha Beck
 Julius Caesar (1970) – British independent film about Julius Caesar
 Michael the Brave (Romanian: Mihai Viteazul) (1970) – Romanian historical epic film about the life of Wallachia's ruler Michael the Brave
 Ned Kelly (1970) – British-Australian biographical film about Australian Bushranger Ned Kelly
 Patton (1970) – biographical story of U.S. General George S. Patton
 Shangani Patrol (1970) – war film, shot on location in Rhodesia, based on the pursuit of King Lobengula in 1893, ending with the heroic last stand of Major Allan Wilson and his men
 Soldier Blue (1970) – Revisionist Western film adapted by John Gay from the novel Arrow in the Sun by T.V. Olsen, it is inspired by events of the 1864 Sand Creek massacre in the Colorado Territory
 Song of Norway (1970) – about Norwegian composer and pianist Edvard Grieg
 Tora! Tora! Tora! (1970) – sprawling Japanese and American production of the 1941 attack on Pearl Harbor
 Tropic of Cancer (1970) – drama film about American novelist Henry Miller
 The Wild Child (French: L'Enfant sauvage) (1970) – French film about feral child Victor of Aveyron

1971 
 10 Rillington Place (1971) – depiction of the events surrounding the wrongful execution of Timothy Evans, a Welshman framed for the death of his daughter by his landlord, English serial killer John Christie, who killed women in his flat at 10 Rillington Place; parts of the film were filmed in the actual location; exterior shots were filmed in Number 10; interiors were shot in Number 7
 Brian's Song (1971) – the story of Brian Piccolo, a running back for the Chicago Bears, his cross-racial friendship with teammate Gale Sayers, and his ultimately losing battle with cancer
 The Devils (1971) – British historical drama horror film dramatised historical account of the rise and fall of Urbain Grandier, a 17th-century Roman Catholic priest executed for withcraft following the supposed possessions in Loudon, France; it also focuses on Sister Jeanne des Agnes, a sexually repressed nun who inadvertently incites the accusations
 Dirty Harry (1971) – inspired by the Zodiac killings of the 1960s and early 70s
 Doc (1971) – story of Doc Holliday
 Evel Knievel (1971) – biographical film about motorcycle stunt performer and daredevil artist Evel Knievel
 The French Connection (1971) – based on the story of drug smuggling from Marseilles to New York City in the 1960s
 Joe Hill (1971) – biopic about the famous Swedish–American labor activist and songwriter Joe Hill, born Joel Emanuel Hägglund in Gävle, Sweden
 The Life of Leonardo da Vinci (1971) – dramatizing the life of the Italian Renaissance genius Leonardo da Vinci
 Macbeth (1971) – historical drama about Macbeth of Scotland
 Man in the Wilderness (1971) – Revisionist western film loosely based on the life of Hugh Glass
 Mary, Queen of Scots (1971) – British-American biographical film based on the life of Mary, Queen of Scots
 Mathias Kneissl (1971) – West German drama film portraying the Bavarian outlaw, poacher and popular social rebel Mathias Kneißl
 Mourir d'aimer ( To Die of Love) (1971) – Franco–Italian film based on the story of Gabrielle Russier, a 32-year-old divorced French teacher in Marseille who killed herself on 1 September 1969 after being found guilty of corruption of a minor
 The Music Lovers (1971) – based on the life and career of 19th-century Roman composer Pyotr Ilyich Tchaikovsky
 Nicholas and Alexandra (1971) – Czar Nicholas II, the inept monarch of Russia insensitive to the needs of his people, is overthrown and exiled to Siberia with his family
 Sacco & Vanzetti (1971) – based on the events surrounding the trial and execution of Nicola Sacco and Bartolomeo Vanzetti, two anarchists of Italian origin, who were sentenced to death for murdering a guard and a paymaster during the April 15, 1920 armed robbery of the Slater and Morrill Shoe Company in Braintree, Massachusetts
 The Todd Killings (1971) – psychological thriller based on the true crimes of serial killer Charles Schmid in the 1960s
 The Zodiac Killer (1971) – based on the murders committed by the Zodiac Killer in the San Francisco area
 Who Says I Can't Ride a Rainbow! (1971) – drama film based on the true story of Barney Morowitz, who "struggled to maintain a pony stable in Greenwich Village"

1972 
 1776 (1972) – adaptation of the 1969 Broadway musical of the same name about the composition and signing of the United States Declaration of Independence
 Aguirre, the Wrath of God (German: Aguirre, der Zorn Gottes) (1972) – German epic historical drama film about the travels of Spanish soldier Lope de Aguirre, who leads a group of conquistadores down the Amazon River in South America in search of the legendary city of gold, El Dorado
 And Give My Love to the Swallows (Czech: ...a pozdravuji vlaštovky) (1972) – Czech biographical film based on the prison diary from Czech resistance fighter Marie Kudeříková
 Antony and Cleopatra (1972) – film adaptation of the play of the same name by William Shakespeare
 The Assassination of Trotsky (1972) – British historical drama about Leon Trotsky
 Brother Sun, Sister Moon (Italian: Fratello Sole, Sorella Luna) (1972) – Italian biography about Saint Francis of Assisi
 Burke & Hare (1972) – horror film based on the Burke and Hare murders
 Dauria (1972) – Soviet historical action/drama set in Siberia, Russia, adapted from the novel of the same name by Konstantin Sedykh
 Dirty Little Billy (1972) – biography about Billy the Kid
 The Great Northfield Minnesota Raid (1972) – Technicolor drama western film about the James-Younger Gang
 The Great Waltz (1972) – biographical musical film about Austrian composer Johann Strauss II
 Henry VIII and His Six Wives (1972) – British film about Henry VIII
 Lady Caroline Lamb (1972) – British epic romantic drama film based on the life of Lady Caroline Lamb, lover of Lord Byron and wife of William Lamb, 2nd Viscount Melbourne
 Lady Sings the Blues (1972) – about jazz singer Billie Holiday, loosely based on her 1956 autobiography
 The Life and Times of Judge Roy Bean (1972) – based on the life of Judge Roy Bean
 Living Free (1972) – biography about George Adamson and Joy Adamson
 The Longest Night (1972) – made-for-television drama film based on the 1968 Barbara Mackle kidnapping by Gary Steven Krist
 Ludwig: Requiem for a Virgin King (1972) – about Ludwig II of Bavaria
 The Mattei Affair (Italian: Il Caso Mattei) (1972) – Italian film depicting the life and mysterious death of Enrico Mattei, an Italian businessman in the aftermath of World War II
 Pancho Villa (1972) – about legendary Mexican revolutionary general Francisco "Pancho" Villa
 Pope Joan (1972) – historical drama film based on the story of Pope Joan
 Prvi splitski odred (1972) – Croatian film based on true events from the very beginning of the Second World War in Dalmatia. 
 Savage Messiah (1972) – British biographical film based on the life of French painter and sculptor Henri Gaudier-Brzeska
 The Valachi Papers (1972) – true story of American Mafia informant Joseph Valachi, based on the book by Peter Maas
 The Weekend Nun (1972) – television film based on the true story of Joyce Duco, a nun who became a probation officer

1973 
 Achanak (1973) – Indian Hindi film inspired by the real-life sensational 1958 murder case KM Nanavati v State of Maharashtra
 Badlands (1973) – fictionalized account of the 1957 Nebraska murder spree by Charles Starkweather and his 15-year-old girlfriend Caril Ann Fugate
 The Blockhouse (1973) – drama film based on a 1955 novel by Jean-Paul Clébert
 The Castle of Purity (Spanish: El castillo de la pureza) (1973) – Mexican drama film depicting a man who keeps his family isolated in his home for years to protect them from "the evil nature of human beings" while inventing, with his wife, rat poison
 The Day of the Jackal (1973) – about a professional assassin known only as the "Jackal" who is hired to assassinate French president Charles de Gaulle in the summer of 1963
 Dillinger (1973) – the story of the 1930s gangster John Dillinger, starring Warren Oates
 The Exorcist (1973) – based on William Peter Blatty's novel of the same name, which is based on a 1949 case of demonic possession that Blatty heard about as a student at Georgetown University
 Explosion (Romanian: Explozia) (1973) – Romanian film about a real event that took place in 1970, the fire of the ship Vrachos (renamed in the film as Poseidon) on which 3,700 of 4-000 tons of ammonium nitrate were loaded and which threatened to destroy the city Galați 
 Ludwig (1973) –  biographical film about the life and death of King Ludwig II of Bavaria
 The Man Without a Country (1973) – made-for-television drama film based on the short story "The Man Without a Country" by Edward Everett Hale 
 Outrage (1973) – made-for-television film telling the story of a suburban neighborhood and family that is repeatedly terrorized by a group of privileged young men from neighboring families
 Papillon (1973) – based on the life of French convict Henri Charrière
 Serpico (1973) – the story of New York City policeman Frank Serpico
 Sunshine (1973) – made-for-television drama film about a young wife and mother who dies of cancer at age 20
 The Tenderness of Wolves (German: Die Zärtlichkeit der Wölfe) (1973) – West German drama film based on the crimes of German serial killer and cannibal Fritz Haarmann
 Walking Tall (1973) – about real life Sheriff Buford Pusser, a former wrestler turned lawman in McNairy County, Tennessee

1974 
 Black Thursday (French: Les Guichets du Louvre) (1974) – French film based on a semi-autobiographical 1960 novel by Roger Bousinnot, the film portrays the terrible events of the Vel' d'Hiv Roundup in 1942 when French police arrested over 13,000 Jewish inhabitants of Paris and held them under inhumane conditions for deportation to Auschwitz, where virtually all were murdered
 Deranged (1974) – Canadian-American horror film loosely based on the crimes of Ed Gein
 The Dove (1974) – biographical film based on the real life experiences of Robin Lee Graham, a young man who spent five years sailing around the world as a single-handed sailor, starting when he was 16 years old
 The Execution of Private Slovik (1974) – made-for-television film telling the story of Private Eddie Slovik, the only American soldier to be executed for desertion since the American Civil War
 Houston, We've Got a Problem (1974) – television film about the Apollo 13 spaceflight
 Lacombe Lucien (1974) – French war drama film about a French teenage boy during the German occupation of France in World War II
 Larry (1974) – drama film based on Robert T. McQueen's 1973 book Larry: Case History of a Mistake
 Last Days of Mussolini (Italian: Mussolini: Ultimo atto) (1974) – Italian historical drama film depicting the downfall of the Italian dictator Benito Mussolini
 Lenny (1974) – biographical film about the comedian Lenny Bruce
 Man on a Swing (1974) – thriller film loosely drawn from a true-life murder investigation, and based on a non-fiction book The Girl on the Volkswagen Floor (1971) by journalist William Arthur Clark
 Miracles Still Happen (Italian: I miracoli accadono ancora) (1974) – Italian film based on the story of Juliane Diller, the sole survivor of 92 passengers and crew, in the 24 December 1971 crash of LANSA Flight 508 in the Peruvian rainforest
 The Murri Affair (Italian: Fatti di gente perbene) (1974) – Italian/French historical drama film based on real events of a notorious 1902 murder trial
 Only "Old Men" Are Going Into Battle (Russian: V boy idut odni "stariki) (1974) – Soviet war drama black-and-white film produced in the Ukrainian SSR about World War II fighter pilots
 Orders (French: Les Ordres)  (1974) – Canadian historical drama film about the incarceration of innocent civilians during the 1970 October Crisis and the War Measures Act enacted by the Canadian government of Pierre Trudeau
 The Sugarland Express (1974) – crime drama film about a husband and wife trying to outrun the law, based on a real-life incident. In the movie, a woman and her husband take a police officer hostage and flee across the United States, as they try to get to their child before he is placed in foster care
 The Super Cops (1974) – action adventure film based on the book The Super Cops: The True Story of the Cops Called Batman and Robin by L. H. Whittemore about two New York City cops, Greenberg & Hantz who became detectives and were known on the streets as "Batman & Robin"
 The Texas Chain Saw Massacre (1974) – horror film based on the murders of two women by Ed Gein
 Trapped Beneath the Sea (1974) – television film loosely based on the 1973 Johnson Sea Link accident

1975 
 84 Charing Cross Road (1975) – British-American drama film based on a play by James Roose-Evans, which itself was an adaptation of the 1970 epistolary memoir of the same name by Helene Hanff, a compilation of letters between herself and Frank Doel dating from 1949 to 1968
 A Woman Called Sada Abe (Japanese: Jitsuroku Abe Sada) (1975) – Roman porno version of the Sada Abe story, based on the true story of a woman who strangled her lover during a love-making session, then severed his penis, which she carried with her until her arrest
 Champion of Death (Japanese: Kenka karate kyokushinken) (1975) – Japanese martial arts film based on karate master Masutatsu Oyama
 The Day That Shook the World (Serbo-Croatian: Sarajevski atentat) (1975) – Czechoslovak-Yugoslav-German co-production about the assassination of Archduke Franz Ferdinand and his wife Sophie in Sarajevo in 1914 and the immediate aftermath that led to the outbreak of World War I
 The Deadly Tower (1975) – made-for-television action drama thriller film based on the University of Texas tower shooting
 Dersu Uzala (1975) – Soviet-Japanese co-production film based on the 1923 memoir Dersu Uzala by Russian explorer Vladimir Arsenyev
 Dog Day Afternoon (1975) – depiction of the events surrounding a 1972 Brooklyn bank robbery, of which real American bank robber John Wojtowicz, played by Al Pacino, said was "only 30% true"
 Fear on Trial (1975) – TV film about the blacklisting of John Henry Faulk
 Flic Story (French: Il était une fois un flic) (1975) – French crime thriller based on the autobiography of the same name written by French police detective Roger Borniche. Both film and book portray Borniche's nine-year pursuit of French gangster and murderer Emile Buisson, who was executed on February 28, 1956
 Graveyard of Honor (Japanese: Jingi no Hakaba) (1975) – Japanese Yakuza film, an adaptation of Fujita Goro's novel of the same name, based on the life of real-life Yakuza member Rikio Ishikawa
 The Happy Hooker (1975) – biographical comedy film adapted from the best-selling memoir by Xaviera Hollander
 The Hiding Place (1975) – based on the autobiographical book of the same name by Corrie ten Boom that recounts her and her family's experiences before and during their imprisonment in a Nazi concentration camp during the Holocaust during World War II
 The Hindenburg (1975) – depiction of German airship LZ 129 Hindenburg, which exploded on landing in 1937
 La Raulito (1975) – Argentine film telling the story of Mary Esher Duffau, who as a teenage girl adopted the identity of a man in order to survive on the streets of Buenos Aires
 The Legend of Lizzie Borden (1975) – made-for-television movie based on the 1892 trial of Lizzie Borden
 The Night That Panicked America (1975) – made-for-television drama film dramatizing events surrounding Orson Welles' famous - and infamous - War of the Worlds radio broadcast which had led some Americans to believe that an invasion by Martians was occurring in the area near Grover's Mill in West Windsor, New Jersey
 Operation: Daybreak (1975) – Second World War film based on the true story of Operation Anthropoid, the assassination of SS General Reinhard Heydrich in Prague
 The Other Side of the Mountain (1975) – drama romance film based on a 1966 true story of ski racing champion Jill Kinmont
 Recommendation for Mercy (1975) – Canadian film fictionalizing the murder trial of Steven Truscott
 The Silence (1975) – made-for-TV movie about James Pelosi, a West Point cadet who was charged in 1971 with cheating on an exam. He remained at West Point but was subjected to "The Silence" – a policy that ostracized cadets who broke the Honor Code
 The Story of Adele H. (French: L'Histoire d'Adèle H.) (1975) – French historical drama film about Adèle Hugo, the daughter of writer Victor Hugo, whose obsessive unrequited love for a military officer leads to her downfall
 Un sac de billes (1975) – French film based on the 1973 autobiographical novel Un sac de billes by Joseph Joffo
 Walking Tall Part 2 (1975) – crime/action film about sheriff Buford Pusser who continues his one-man war against moonshiners and a ruthless crime syndicate after the murder of his wife in late 1960s Tennessee

1976 
 21 Hours at Munich (1976) – made-for-television drama history sport thriller film based on the book The Blood of Israel by Serge Groussard, it deals with real events concerning the Munich massacre during the 1972 Summer Olympics
 All the President's Men (1976) – reporters Bob Woodward and Carl Bernstein uncover the details of the Watergate scandal leading to President Nixon's resignation
 Bitayin si... Baby Ama! (1976) – Filipino film depicting the life of executed murderer and gang leader, Marciál "Baby" Ama
 Bound for Glory (1976) – biopic about depression-era folk singer and social advocate Woody Guthrie
 Bruce Lee: The Man, The Myth (1976) – semi biographical martial arts film chronicling Bruce Lee's life
 Canoa: A Shameful Memory (Spanish: Canoa: memoria de un hecho vergonzoso) (1976) – Mexican drama film based upon the San Miguel Canoa Massacre
 Hawmps! (1976) – western slapstick film about a United States Cavalry experiment to introduce camels into the service in the western United States, specifically Texas
 Helter Skelter (1976) – an account of the Tate / Leno and Rosemary LaBianca murders in Los Angeles in 1969, perpetrated by the Manson Family
 In the Realm of the Senses (Japanese: Ai no korīda) (1976) – French-Japanese art film, a fictionalized and sexually explicit treatment of an incident from 1930s Japan, that of Sada Abe
 Jack the Ripper (1976) – German thriller film, starring Klaus Kinski as serial killer Jack the Ripper
 The Last Supper (Spanish: La última cena) (1976) – Cuban historical film telling the story of a pious Havana plantation owner in the 1790s, during Cuba's Spanish colonial period
 The Lindbergh Kidnapping Case (1976) – dramatization of the Lindbergh kidnapping, investigation, and trial of Bruno Hauptmann
 The Loneliest Runner (1976) – autobiographical made-for-television film following the story of 13-year-old John Curtis (based on Michael Landon) who still wets the bed and finds escapism from his abusive mother by going running after school
 The Message (1976) – epic biographical film about the life and times of Prophet Muhammad
 Please, Don't Bury Me Alive! (1976) – independent film based on the true story of a young Chicano from San Antonio Texas in the spring of 1972 amid the Chicano Movement
 Raid on Entebbe (1976) – television film based on Operation Entebbe and the freeing of hostages at Entebbe Airport in Entebbe, Uganda
 Salon Kitty (1976) – erotic-war-drama based on the novel of the same name by Peter Norden, covering the Salon Kitty incident
 Shout at the Devil (1976) – British war adventure film based on a novel by Wilbur Smith which is very loosely inspired by real events
 Survive! (Spanish: Supervivientes de los Andes - Andes Survivors) (1976) – Mexican thriller film based on the 1973 book Survive! by Clay Blair, which is based on the Uruguayan Air Force Flight 571
 Sybil (1976) – two-part TV mini-series inspired by the life of Shirley Ardell Mason, who was diagnosed with multiple personality disorder
 The Tenth Level (1976) – drama film inspired by the Stanley Milgram obedience research
 The Town That Dreaded Sundown (1976) – loosely based on the actual crimes attributed to an unidentified serial killer known as the Phantom Killer who terrorized the residents in the town of Texarkana, Texas
 Voyage of the Damned (1976) – drama war film inspired by actual events concerning the fate of the ocean liner  carrying Jewish refugees from Germany to Cuba in 1939

1977 
 A Bridge Too Far (1977) – the story of the failure of Operation Market Garden during World War II
 Advantage (Bulgarian: Avantazh) (1977) – Bulgarian film revealing the story of "the Rooster", a thief and former prisoner who tries to adjust to a new, socialist Bulgaria after September 9, 1944
 Black Journal (Italian: Gran bollito) (1977) – Italian black comedy film loosely based on real-life serial killer Leonarda Cianciulli, who killed three women between 1939 and 1940, and turned their bodies into soap and teacakes
 The Black Panther (1977) – British crime film about ex-military criminal Donald Neilson, known as the "Black Panther"
 Brothers (1977) – based on the relationship between radical black activist Angela Davis and Black Guerrilla Family founder George Jackson
 Bruce Lee's Secret (Cantonese: Yong chun jie quan) (1977) – Hong Kong pseudo biopic of Bruce Lee
 Julia (1977) – holocaust period drama film based on a chapter from Lillian Hellman's controversial book Pentimento (1973), about the author's alleged friendship with a woman named, "Julia", who fought against the Nazis in the years prior to World War II
 Lucio Flavio (Portuguese: Lúcio Flávio, o Passageiro da Agonia) (1977) – Brazilian film based on the book of the same name by José Louzeiro, about Lúcio Flávio, a famous bandit in Rio de Janeiro in the 1970s 
 MacArthur (1977) – a retelling of World War II-era General of the Army Douglas MacArthur's life from 1942, before the Battle of Bataan, to 1952, after he had been removed from his Korean War command by President Truman for insubordination
 Operation Stadium (Serbo-Croatian: Akcija stadion) (1977) – Croatian film about events in Zagreb in 1941
 Operation Thunderbolt (Hebrew: Mivtsa Yonatan) (1977) – Israeli film based on the Israeli commando raid in Entebbe, Uganda, to release more than 100 hostages
 Soldier of Orange (Dutch: Soldaat van Oranje) (1977) – Dutch romance-thriller film set around the German occupation of the Netherlands during World War II, and based on the autobiographical book Soldaat van Oranje by Erik Hazelhoff Roelfzema
 Something for Joey (1977) – made-for-television sport drama film about the relationship between college football player John Cappelletti and his younger brother Joey
 Walking Tall: Final Chapter (1977) – about Buford Pusser's last days as Sheriff of McNairy County, Tennessee in 1970 and his subsequent death in 1974

1978 
 A Death in Canaan (1978) – made-for-television drama film about the true-life story of a teenager who is put on trial for the murder of his mother in a small Connecticut town. The film is based on the book of the same name by Joan Barthel
 The Brink's Job (1978) – crime comedy drama film based on the Brink's robbery of 1950 in Boston, where almost 3 million dollars was stolen
 The Buddy Holly Story (1978) – biopic about Texas musician Buddy Holly
 The Canal (Turkish: Kanal) (1978) – Turkish drama film about Mehmet Can, Minister of Justice
 Crash (1978) – made-for-TV drama film based on the true story of the first crash of a wide-body aircraft, that of Eastern Air Lines Flight 401, a Lockheed L-1011 TriStar which crashed in the Florida Everglades near Miami on the night of December 29, 1972
 The First Great Train Robbery (1978) – British heist neo-noir crime film based on the 1975 novel The Great Train Robbery
 I Miss You, Hugs and Kisses (1978) – Canadian drama-mystery film based on the Peter Demeter murder case
 Little Boy Lost (1978) – Australian drama film based on the true story of a missing Australian child, Stephen Walls 
 Midnight Express (1978) – based on the book by William Hayes and his experiences after he is caught smuggling drugs out of Turkey and thrown into prison
 The Nativity (1978) – made-for-television biographical drama film set around the Nativity of Jesus and based on the accounts in the canonical Gospels of Matthew and Luke, in the apocryphal gospels of Pseudo-Matthew and James, and in the Golden Legend
 The Pyjama Girl Case (Italian: La ragazza dal pigiama giallo) (1978) – Italian giallo film based on a real story, the "Pyjama Girl" case, one of Australia's most well known unsolved murders
 Ruby and Oswald (1978) – made-for-television drama film about the assassination of United States  President John F. Kennedy
 The Tailor from Ulm (German: Der Schneider von Ulm) (1978) – West German drama film about a German pioneer aviator, Albrecht Berblinger, in the late 18th century
 The Toolbox Murders (1978) – slasher film depicting a series of violent murders centered around a Los Angeles apartment complex, followed by the kidnapping and disappearance of a teenage girl who resides there. The film was marketed as being a dramatization of a true story
 Violette Nozière (1978) – French crime film based on a true French murder case in 1933

1979 
 Agatha (1979) – British drama thriller film focusing on renowned crime writer Agatha Christie's famous 11-day disappearance in 1926
 The Amityville Horror (1979) – based on the alleged real-life experiences of the Lutz family, who buys a new home in Long Island, only to flee after they experience a series of frightening paranormal events along with the murders of the DeFeo family by Ronald DeFeo, Jr.
 Birth of the Beatles (1979) – biographical film focusing on the early history of The Beatles
 Caligula (1979) – Italian-American erotic historical drama film about the Roman Emperor Caligula
 Crossbar (1979) – Canadian television film, a fictionalized account of the career of Canadian amputee athlete Arnie Boldt
 Can You Hear the Laughter? The Story of Freddie Prinze (1979) – made-for-television biographical drama film of the life of stand-up comedian and actor Freddie Prinze
 Dummy (1979) – made-for-television drama film based on Ernest Tidyman's nonfiction book of the same name, the film dramatizes the life of Lang, an African-American deaf man from Chicago who was acquitted of the murders of two prostitutes
 Escape from Alcatraz (1979) – prison film based on the June 1962 Alcatraz escape attempt
 Friendly Fire (1979) – television movie telling the real-life story of Peg Mullen, a woman from rural Iowa who with her husband works against government obstacles to uncover the actual details and facts about the death of their son Michael, an Army infantry soldier killed by "friendly fire" in February 1970 during the Vietnam War
 The Great Riviera Bank Robbery (1979) – British heist film based on a bank robbery, masterminded by Albert Spaggiari in 1976
 Guyana: Crime of the Century (1979) – Mexican/American exploitation drama film based on the Jonestown Massacre
 The House on Garibaldi Street (1979) – television movie based on the non-fiction book of the same name about the Mossad operation that captured Adolf Eichmann in Argentina in 1960 and returned him to Israel for trial
 The Hussy (French: La drôlesse) (1979) – French drama film about the kidnapping of an 11-year old, who develops stockholm syndrome
 The Last Ride of the Dalton Gang (1979) – made-for-television western film following the story of the Dalton Gang from their beginnings in Montgomery County, Kansas to their attempt to rob two banks simultaneously in Coffeyville, Kansas
 Meera (1979) – Hindi language film based on the life of Meera, a Hindu saint-poet who renounced princely comforts in pursuit of her love for Lord Krishna
 Norma Rae (1979) – based on the true story of Crystal Lee Jordan, who works in a North Carolina textile mill, and becomes involved in organizing a union
 On Giant's Shoulders (1979) – television film about the early life of thalidomide victim Terry Wiles, with Wiles playing himself
 The Onion Field (1979) – neo-noir crime drama film based on Joseph Wambaugh's 1973 true crime book The Onion Field
 Operación Ogro (1979) – Spanish/Italian drama film based on the assassination of Luis Carrero Blanco by 4 members of ETA in 1973
 S.O.S. Titanic (1979) – British/American 1979 television movie that depicts the doomed 1912 maiden voyage from the perspective of three distinct groups of passengers in First, Second, and Third Class
 The Triangle Factory Fire Scandal (1979) – made-for-television drama film chronicling the March 25, 1911 Triangle Shirtwaist Factory fire in which 146 garment workers died and which spurred the growth of the International Ladies' Garment Workers' Union
 Undercover with the KKK (1979) – TV movie based on the autobiography My Undercover Years with the Ku Klux Klan by Gary Thomas Rowe Jr.
 Vengeance Is Mine (Japanese: Fukushū Suru wa Ware ni Ari) (1979) – Japanese film based on the book of the same name by Ryūzō Saki. It depicts the true story of serial killer Akira Nishiguchi
 Zulu Dawn (1979) – war film about the 1879 Battle of Isandlwana; prequel to Zulu (1964)

1980s

1980 
 A Time for Miracles (1980) – made-for-television biographical drama film chronicling the life story of America's first native born saint, Elizabeth Ann Bayley Seton
 Act of Love (1980) – made-for-television film adaptation of the book Act of Love: The Killing of George Zygmanik by Judith Paige Mitchell. It is based on a true story concerning a man performing euthanasia on his paralyzed brother
 Attica (1980) – television film depicting the events leading up to and during the 1971 Attica Correctional Facility riot and the aftermath
 Breaker Morant (1980) – based on the 1902 court martial of Breaker Morant during the Boer War
 Chhutir Ghonta (1980) – Bangladeshi drama film based on the true story of a twelve-year-old school boy named Khokon in Bangladesh, who starved to death after the washroom he was in was mistakenly closed 
 Coal Miner's Daughter (1980) – adapted from the autobiographical book by Loretta Lynn and George Vecsey
 The Diary of Anne Frank (1980) – made-for-television biographical drama film about Anne Frank's diary
 The Elephant Man (1980) – the story of Joseph Merrick, an Englishman with severe deformities who was exhibited as a human curiosity named "the Elephant Man"
 The Fiancee (German: Die Verlobte) (1980) – East German drama film based on a novel by Eva Lippold, about the resistance of the communist Hella Lindau and her fiancé Hermann Reimers against the Nazis
 Heaven's Gate (1980) – Western film loosely based on the Johnson County War of 1889–1893
 Hide in Plain Sight (1980) – drama film with the storyline based on an actual case from the files of New York attorney Salvatore R. Martoche who represented Tom Leonard, a real-life Buffalo, New York, victim who had sued to recover contact with his children estranged by the culpability of the new husband and government
 Lion of the Desert (1980) – historical war film which tells the story of Omar Mukhtar fighting against the fascist regime of Mussolini in Libya
 McVicar (1980) – based on the story of British gangster John McVicar, played by The Who lead singer Roger Daltrey
 Playing for Time (1980) – television film based on acclaimed musician Fania Fénelon's autobiography The Musicians of Auschwitz, about Fénelon's experience as a female prisoner in the Auschwitz concentration camp, where she and a group of classical musicians were spared in return for performing music for their captors
 Raging Bull (1980) – based on the life and career of middleweight boxing champ Jake LaMotta
 Rape and Marriage: The Rideout Case (1980) – based on the true story of the trial of John Rideout, who was accused of raping his wife Greta in Oregon, 1978
 The Scarlett O'Hara War (1980) – made-for-TV drama film based on the 1979 novel Moviola by Garson Kanin, about the search for the actress to play Scarlett O'Hara in the much anticipated film adaptation of Gone with the Wind (1939)
 The Sea Wolves (1980) – based on the events surrounding Operation Creek during World War II
 Tom Horn (1980) – Western film about the legendary lawman, outlaw, and gunfighter Tom Horn, based on Horn's own writings

1981 
 Bad Blood (1981) – British-New Zealand thriller film set during World War II in the small town of Koiterangi on the west coast of the South Island of New Zealand, and is based on the factual manhunt for mass-murderer Stanley Graham
 Bitter Harvest (1981) – made-for-television drama film about an accidental poisoning of cattle feed in the Midwest in the 1970s. Its plot is based on the 1973 Michigan PBB contamination incident
 The Boat Is Full (German: Das Boot ist voll) (1981) – German-language Swiss film, The title of the film derives from what was expressed by the Swiss during World War II, for as a nonbelligerent country many refugees desired entry there, with most being denied permission. 
 The Bushido Blade (1981) – historical martial-arts film portraying a fictional sideline to the true events surrounding the treaty Commodore Matthew Perry signed with the Shogun of feudal Japan
 Charlotte (1981) – Dutch biography film about German-Jewish painter Charlotte Salomon, who was murdered in the Holocaust
 The Children Nobody Wanted (1981) – made-for-television drama film based on the true story of child advocate Tom Butterfield (1940–1982), the youngest bachelor to become a legal foster parent in the state of Missouri, and his creation of the Butterfield Ranch
 Christiane F. – We Children from Bahnhof Zoo (1981) – West German drama depicting the life of teenage girl Christiane F.
 Circle of Power (1981) – based on the non-fiction book The Pit: A Group Encounter Defiled
 Das Boot (1981) – West German war film, an adaptation of Lothar-Günther Buchheim's 1973 German novel of the same name, the film is set during World War II and follows  and its crew, as they set out on a hazardous patrol in the Battle of the Atlantic
 Death Hunt (1981) – Western action film, a fictionalized account of the Royal Canadian Mounted Police (RCMP) pursuit of a man named Albert Johnson
 Death of a Centerfold: The Dorothy Stratten Story (1981) – made-for-television biographical drama film, about the life and the murder of Playboy Playmate of the Year Dorothy Stratten
 The Entity (1981) – based on Carla Moran and her experiences with a supernatural being that plagued her family for years
 Gallipoli (1981) – depiction of the Anzac battlefield at Gallipoli and the Battle of the Nek on August 7, 1915
 Grambling's White Tiger (1981) – TV movie about the true story of Jim Gregory, the first white quarterback at Grambling College, a historically black college in 1962
 Hoodwink (1981) – Australian thriller film based on the true story of a well-publicized Australian con artist
 Inchon (1981) – South Korean–American war film about the Battle of Inchon in 1950; financed by Unification Church founder Sun Myung Moon
 The Killing of Randy Webster (1981) – made-for-television drama film based on a true story regarding a young man who is shot and killed in an altercation with Houston police
 Lili Marleen (1981) – West German drama film about the autobiographical novel Der Himmel hat viele Farben (The Heavens Have Many Colors) by Lale Andersen
 Mephisto (1981) – drama film based on the novel of the same title by Klaus Mann, about a German stage actor who finds unexpected success and mixed blessings in the popularity of his performance in a Faustian play as the Nazis take power in pre-WWII Germany
 Miracle on Ice (1981) – television sports drama film about the United States men's national ice hockey team, led by head coach Herb Brooks, that won the gold medal in the 1980 Winter Olympics. The USA team's victory over the heavily favored Soviet team in the medal round was dubbed the "Miracle on Ice"
 Mommie Dearest (1981) – based on the controversial biography by Joan Crawford's adopted daughter Christina Crawford, the film documents the later years of Joan's career and her alleged abuse against her daughter
 Murder in Texas (1981) – television film based on the true story of the death of Joan Robinson Hill, this film tells of a plastic surgeon who was suspected of causing the death of his first wife, the daughter of a wealthy member of Houston society
 Peter and Paul (1981) – television miniseries that originally aired in two parts, it covers much of the Book of Acts in its Biblical re-telling of chapters 8 through 28, including the apostolic missionary journeys and interactions of and Peter the Fisherman and Paul of Tarsus
 Prince of the City (1981) – neo-noir crime drama film based on Robert Daley's 1978 book of the same name about an NYPD officer who chooses to expose police corruption for idealistic reasons. The character of Daniel Ciello, was based on real-life NYPD Narcotics Detective Robert Leuci
 Ragtime (1981) – drama film based on the 1975 historical novel Ragtime by E. L. Doctorow including fictionalized references to actual people and events of the time
 Reds (1981) – American journalist and radical John Reed becomes involved with the Bolshevik revolution in Russia, during which he wrote Ten Days That Shook the World
 Skokie (1981) – television film based on the real life NSPA Controversy of Skokie, Illinois, which involved the National Socialist Party of America. This controversy would be fought in court and reach the level of the United States Supreme Court in National Socialist Party of America v. Village of Skokie
 St. Helens (1981) – made-for-cable television film centering on the events leading up to the cataclysmic 1980 eruption of Mount St. Helens in Washington, with the story beginning on the day volcanic activity started on March 20, 1980, and ending on the day of the eruption, May 18, 1980

1982 
 Angel (Greek: Angelos) (1982) – Greek drama film based on the love affair of 19-year-old sailor Christos Roussos and 22-year-old sailor Anestis Papadopoulos, a relationship that led to the murder of the latter on April 7, 1976, and the conviction of Christos, names in the film differ from reality
 Antonieta (1982) – Spanish film based on the life of Mexican writer Antonieta Rivas Mercado 
 The Ballad of Gregorio Cortez (1982) – Western film based on the book With His Pistol in His Hand by Americo Paredes, about Gregorio Cortez
 The Best Little Whorehouse in Texas (1982) – musical comedy film adaptation of the 1978 Broadway musical and book of the same name by Larry L. King, which is based on a story by King that was inspired by the real-life Chicken Ranch in La Grange, Texas
 Die Weiße Rose ( The White Rose) (1982) – CCC Film production about the White Rose resistance to the Nazis led by university students in Munich in 1942–1943 whose members were caught and executed in February 1943, shortly after the German capitulation at Stalingrad
 Fitzcarraldo (1982) – West German epic adventure-drama film portraying would-be rubber baron Brian Sweeney Fitzgerald, an Irishman known in Peru as Fitzcarraldo, who is determined to transport a steamship over a steep hill to access a rich rubber territory in the Amazon Basin. The film is derived from the historic events of Peruvian rubber baron Carlos Fitzcarrald
 Flight of the Eagle (Swedish: Ingenjör Andrées luftfärd) (1982) – Swedish biographical drama film based on Per Olof Sundman's 1967 novelization of the true story of S. A. Andrée's Arctic balloon expedition of 1897, an ill-fated effort to reach the North Pole in which all three expedition members perished
 Frances (1982) – based on the story of actress Frances Farmer, who battled the studio system and mental illness
 Gandhi (1982) – biographical film based on the life of Mahatma Gandhi
 Heatwave (1982) – based on the murder of Juanita Nielsen
 Little Gloria... Happy at Last (1982) – television miniseries based on the book by Barbara Goldsmith, it tells the story of the real-life heiress Gloria Vanderbilt and how her parents met and married
 Love Child (1982) – biopic based on the life of Terry Jean Moore, a young woman who was convicted of a crime at the age of 19 and gets pregnant in jail
 Luz del Fuego (1982) – Brazilian film based on the life of Brazilian vedette and activist Dora Vivacqua, mostly known by her stage name Luz del Fuego
 Madrasile Mon (1982) – Indian Malayalam-language true crime based on the Karikkan villa murder case of 1980
 Marian Rose White (1982) – television film based on Marian Rose White, a California woman who as a 9-year-old was committed to a state mental institution and spent much of her life confined there
 Missing (1982) – based on the true story of American journalist Charles Horman, who disappeared in the bloody aftermath of the US-backed Chilean coup of 1973 that deposed the democratically elected socialist president Salvador Allende
 Night Crossing (1982) – British-American drama film based on the true story of the Strelzyk and Wetzel families, who on September 16, 1979, attempted to escape from East Germany to West Germany in a homemade hot air balloon
 The Return of Martin Guerre (French: Le Retour de Martin Guerre) (1982) – French film based on a case of imposture in 16th century France, involving Martin Guerre
 The Roaring Forties (French: Les quarantièmes rugissants) (1982) – French drama film loosely based on the book The Strange Last Voyage of Donald Crowhurst by Nicholas Tomalin about the death of the British round the world yachtsman Donald Crowhurst in 1969
 Variola Vera (1982) – Yugoslav film about the 1972 Yugoslav smallpox outbreak
 We of the Never Never (1982) – based on the experiences of Jeannie Gunn in the Australian outback during the 1930s

1983 
 10 to Midnight (1983) – crime-horror-thriller film that parallels the murders committed by American mass murderer Richard Speck
 Adam (1983) – television film about the 1981 kidnapping and murder of Adam Walsh
 Adi Shankaracharya (1983) – Sanskrit film based on the life of philosopher Adi Shankaracharya by G. V. Iyer
 Angst (1983) – Austrian horror film that follows a psychopath recently released from prison and is loosely based on real-life mass murderer Werner Kniesek
 Antarctica (Japanese: Nankyoku Monogatari) (1983) – Japanese drama film centering on the 1958 ill-fated Japanese scientific expedition to the South Pole, its dramatic rescue from the impossible weather conditions on the return journey, the relationship between the scientists and their loyal and hard-working Sakhalin huskies 
 The Amorous Dentist (1983) – Australian television drama based on a bizarre murder trial which scandalized the people of Sydney in 1865
 Choices of the Heart (1983) – made-for-television drama film based on the lives of Jean Donovan, Archbishop Oscar Romero, and three American religious sisters who were killed in El Salvador during its Civil War
 Cross Creek (1983) – Mary Steenburgen stars as The Yearling author Marjorie Kinnan Rawlings, based in part on the author's 1942 memoir, Cross Creek
 The Dean Case (1983) – Australian television drama that tells the story of George Dean, a Sydney-based ferry boat master, arrested in 1895 for attempting to poison his wife
 Forbidden Relations (Hungarian: Visszaesők) (1983) – Hungarian drama film based on the true story of a love affair between a half brother and half-sister
 Heart Like a Wheel (1983) – biographical film based on the life of drag racing driver Shirley Muldowney
 Hostage (1983) – Australian crime film based on the true story of Christine Maresch, a teenager living in Wollongong in the 1970s that ends up marrying a sadistic German bank robber named Walter
 The Last Winter (1983) – American-Israeli drama film which tells the story of two women seeking leads to their missing husbands after the end of the Yom Kippur War
 Love Is Forever (1983) – adventure drama based on the experiences of Australian journalist John Everingham in Laos and Thailand
  Merry Christmas Mr. Lawrence (1983) – British-Japanese war film based on Sir Laurens van der Post's experiences as a prisoner of war of the Japanese in World War II as depicted in his books The Seed and the Sower (1963) and The Night of the New Moon (1970)
 Never Cry Wolf (1983) – drama film adaptation of Farley Mowat's 1963 autobiography of the same name
 Policewoman Centerfold (1983) – television movie loosely based on the story of police officer Barbara Schantz who posed for Playboy magazine in 1982
 Quarterback Princess (1983) – made-for-television fact-based sports drama film that chronicles the courage and determination of a teenage girl who struggles against sexism and fights to play on her high school football team
 Reilly: Ace of Spies (1983) – television miniseries dramatizing the life of Sidney Reilly, a Russian-born adventurer who became one of the greatest spies ever to work for the British
 The Right Stuff (1983) – based on Tom Wolfe's 1979 book about the test pilots involved in early high-speed aeronautical research and the United States' first attempt at manned spaceflight
 The Scarlet and the Black (1983) – made-for-television historical war drama film telling the story of Monsignor Hugh O'Flaherty, a real-life Irish Catholic priest who saved thousands of Jews and escaped Allied POWs in Rome
 Silkwood (1983) – inspired by the true-life story of Karen Silkwood, who died in a suspicious car accident while investigating alleged wrongdoing at the Kerr-McGee plutonium plant where she worked
 Star 80 (1983) – biographical drama film adapted from the Pulitzer Prize-winning Village Voice article "Death of a Playmate" by Teresa Carpenter and based on Playboy model Dorothy Stratten, who was murdered by her husband Paul Snider in 1980
 Summerspell (1983) – follows as the members of a large extended family gather on the Fourth of July for a not-so-happy reunion on their California ranch right after World War II
 Thursday's Child (1983) – made-for-television drama film based on the book by Victoria Poole, about a 17-year-old high school star player in baseball who gets a life-threatening heart disease
 Who Will Love My Children? (1983) – made-for-television biographical film based on the life of Lucile Fray, who was diagnosed with cancer in 1952 and wanted to find suitable homes for her ten children, since she felt her husband could not properly care for them 
 Winter 1960 (1983) – Belgian drama based on the Belgian general strike of 1960–1961
 Without a Trace (1983) – drama film based on the novel Still Missing by Beth Gutcheon, the story is partly based on the disappearance of Etan Patz

1984 
 A Proper Scandal (Italian: Uno scandalo perbene) (1984) – Italian drama film based on the Bruneri-Canella case
 Amadeus (1984) – a story adapted by playwright Peter Shaffer, based on the theory that composer Wolfgang Amadeus Mozart was murdered by fellow composer Antonio Salieri
 Attack on Fear (1984) – made-for-television drama film based on the 1980 book The Light on Synanon: How a Country Weekly Exposed a Corporate Cult written by Dave Mitchell, Cathy Mitchell and Richard Ofshe, about married journalists who run a small town newspaper who expose corruption and cultism at a once respected rehab center
 The Bounty (1984) – British historical drama film, the fifth film version of the story of the mutiny on the Bounty
 The Burning Bed (1984) – based on the true story of Francine Hughes, an abused battered wife has enough of her abusive husband; after he rapes her one night, she sets the bed on fire with him asleep in it
 Camila (1984) – Argentine drama film based on the story of the 19th-century Argentine socialite Camila O'Gorman
 The Cowra Breakout (1984) – Australian mini series based on the Cowra breakout, focusing on the friendship between an Australian soldier and Japanese prisoner
 Eureka Stockade (1984) – Australian miniseries based on the battle of Eureka Stockade
 Fatal Vision (1984) – television miniseries based on the Fatal Vision controversy, in the book of the same name, of the murders in 1970 at Fort Bragg of the wife and daughters of U.S. Army officer Jeffrey R. MacDonald
 Flight 90: Disaster on the Potomac (1984) – made-for-television drama film about Air Florida Flight 90 that crashed into the Potomac River in 1982
 Forbidden (1984) – drama film inspired by the life of Maria von Maltzan originally told in the non-fiction book The Last Jews in Berlin by Leonard Gross about a countess who hides her Jewish boyfriend in her apartment in World War II
 John Wycliffe: The Morning Star (1984) – biopic about the life and teachings of John Wycliffe (1324–1384), who was the first to translate the Bible into English
 The Killing Fields (1984) – based on the Cambodian Civil War
 The Man from Majorca (Swedish: Mannen från Mallorca) (1984) – Swedish crime thriller film based on the novel The Pig Party by Leif G. W. Persson, about a robbery in Stockholm
 Mrs. Soffel (1984) – drama film based on the story of condemned brothers Jack and Ed Biddle, who escaped prison with the aid of the warden's wife, Kate Soffel
 Sam's Son (1984) – semi-autobiographical coming-of-age drama film written and directed by Michael Landon loosely based on his early life
 The Schippan Mystery (1984) – Australian television film about the murder of Bertha Schippan in 1902
 Undercover (1984) – Australian film based on Australian underwear manufacturer Fred Burley
 Walls (1984) – Canadian drama film based on the theatrical play by Christian Bruyère, the film is a dramatization of the British Columbia Penitentiary hostage incident of 1975
 Who Killed Hannah Jane? (1984) – Australian television film about the murder conviction of Arthur Peden

1985 
 1918 (1985) – drama film adapted by Horton Foote from his own play, about a small Texas town in the height of the United States involvement in World War I and an influenza epidemic sweeping the town
 Anzacs (1985) – Australian five-part television miniseries set in World War I
 Archer (1985) – Australian made-for-television  western drama film about the true story of Archer the first horse to win the Melbourne Cup and his 17-year-old strapper, Dave Power
 The Assisi Underground (1985) – based on Alexander Ramati's novel of the same name, about Franciscan priest Rufino Niccacci, who is asked by the bishop of Assisi Giuseppe Placido Nicolini to covertly rescue Italian Jews from the Nazis
 The Atlanta Child Murders (1985) – television miniseries inspired by true events, that examines the so-called "Atlanta child murders" of the late 1970s and early 1980s
 Badge of the Assassin (1985) – television film depicting a true story that took place in Harlem during 1971, and based on the 1979 book of the same name – a true-crime account from the former district attorney and New York Times bestselling author Robert K. Tanenbaum and Philip Rosenberg
 Children of the Night (1985) – made-for-television drama film, a fictionalized biopic of Dr. Lois Lee, following her work among young prostitutes in Hollywood and the organization Children of the Night that she founded as a result
 Colonel Redl (German: Oberst Redl) (1985) – biographical drama film following the rise of Alfred Redl, an officer in the Austro-Hungarian Empire. Redl, who comes from a humble background, enters military school as a boy and has an illustrious military career pushed forward by his loyalty to the crown
 Confessions of a Serial Killer (1985) – horror film detailing a serial killer, (based on Henry Lee Lucas) who, after being arrested, confesses to the murders of over 200 women
 Dance with a Stranger (1985) – the story of Ruth Ellis, the nightclub hostess who was the last woman to be hanged in Britain
 Deadly Intentions (1985) – made-for-television thriller film about Dr. Charles Raynor, who carefully plots the murder of his wife
 Displaced Persons (1985) – Australian TV movie about refugees arriving in Australia in 1945
 The Doctor and the Devils (1985) – based on the 1828 Burke and Hare murders, though the names of the characters have been changed
 The Dream (Dutch: De Dream) (1985) – Dutch drama film based on the controversial "Hogerhuis lawsuit" in which the three brothers Hogerhuis were sentenced by the court of Leeuwarden to prison terms of six, eleven and twelve years for burglary and attempted manslaughter
 The Dunera Boys (1985) – Australian mini series based on the Dunera incident
 Eleni (1985) – film adaptation of the memoir Eleni by Greek-American journalist Nicholas Gage
 The Emerald Forest (1985) – loosely based on the (semi-confirmed) true story of a Peruvian worker whose son was abducted by Amazonian indigenous people
 The Falcon and the Snowman (1985) – based on the story of childhood friends, Christopher Boyce and Andrew Daulton Lee, turned traitor spies
 For Those I Loved (French: Au nom de tous les miens) (1985) – Canadian/French/Hungarian drama film about a Polish Jewish Holocaust survivor who emigrated to the United States in 1946, based on the 1972 book titled For Those I Loved written by Martin Gray
 Izzy and Moe (1985) – made-for-television comedy-crime film, a fictional account of two actual Prohibition-era policemen, Izzy Einstein and Moe Smith, and their adventures in tracking down illegal bars and gangsters
 Jenny's War (1985) – war television mini-series set during World War II, based on the novel with the same name of Jack Stoneley
 Love Lives On (1985) – television film about a 15-year-old girl who has to choose between continuing her pregnancy or undergoing treatment for her fast-growing cancer
 Malice in Wonderland (1985) – made-for-television biographical film based on the 1972 novel Hedda and Louella: A Dual Biography of Hedda Hopper and Louella Parsons by George Eells, based-on-real-life stories of powerful Hollywood gossip columnists Hedda Hopper and Louella Parsons, once friends and later rivals
 Marie (1985) – based on Marie Ragghianti's exposure of the 1970s Tennessee Board of Parole scandals, adapted from the book Marie: A True Story by Peter Maas
 Mask (1985) – biographical drama film based on the life and early death of a boy, Roy L. "Rocky" Dennis, who suffered from craniodiaphyseal dysplasia, an extremely rare disorder known commonly as lionitis due to the disfiguring cranial enlargements that it causes
 Out of Africa (1985) – recounts events of the seventeen years when Baroness Karen von Blixen-Finecke lived in Kenya, then called British East Africa, on a coffee plantation
 Out of the Darkness (1985) – made-for-television crime thriller film about the pursuit of the serial killer David Berkowitz by New York City detective Ed Zigo
 Right to Kill? (1985) – made-for-television drama film based on a true story of two teens living in Wyoming, Richard Jahnke and Deborah Jahnke, who were charged for the killing of their psychotically abusive father, Richard Jahnke, Sr.
 Sweet Dreams (1985) – the story of country music legend Patsy Cline
 Train d'enfer ( Operation Double Cross) (1985) – Italian/French/Spanish international co-production spy film based on a novel by René Cambon
 Wallenberg: A Hero's Story (1985) – television film about Raoul Wallenberg, a Swedish diplomat instrumental in saving thousands of Hungarian Jews from the Holocaust

1986 
 Act of Vengeance (1986) – based on the Joseph Yablonski family murders in connection with the United Mine Workers
 Alex: The Life of a Child (1986) – biography about the life and death of Alexandra Deford from cystic fibrosis
 Anastasia: The Mystery of Anna (1986) – American-Austrian-Italian made-for-television biographical film loosely based on the story of Grand Duchess Anastasia Nikolaevna of Russia and the book The Riddle of Anna Anderson by Peter Kurth. It was originally broadcast in two part
 At Close Range (1986) – based on the rural Pennsylvania crime family led by Bruce Johnston, Sr., directed by James Foley
 The Boy in Blue (1986) – Canadian biographical-drama film based on a true story about the life of Toronto sculler Ned Hanlan
 Castaway (1986) – British biographical-drama film adapted from the eponymous 1984 book by Lucy Irvine, telling of her experiences of staying for a year with writer Gerald Kingsland on the isolated island of Tuin, between New Guinea and Australia
 The Climb (1986) – Canadian-British co-produced adventure drama film, a dramatization of mountaineer Hermann Buhl's 1953 attempt to climb Nanga Parbat
 Comrades (1986) – British historical drama film depicting the story of the Tolpuddle Martyrs, who were arrested and transported to Australia in 1834 for trying to improve their conditions by forming an early form of trade union
 The Deliberate Stranger (1986) – television film about American serial killer Ted Bundy
 The Delta Force (1986) – based heavily on the hijacking of TWA Flight 847 in 1985
 Dreams of Gold: The Mel Fisher Story (1986) – made-for-television drama film based on the actual adventures of Treasure Hunter Mel Fisher
 The George McKenna Story (1986) – biographical television film that involves the events at George Washington Preparatory High School in South Los Angeles
 Heartburn (1986) – based on Nora Ephron's autobiographical novel about the breakup of her marriage to Carl Bernstein
 Hoosiers (1986) – loosely based on the 1953–54 Milan High School basketball team, winners of that year's Indiana state high school basketball championship, despite representing a school of only 160 students
 Il camorrista ( The Professor) (1986) – Italian drama adapted from the novel by Giuseppe Marrazzo, based on the true story of the Italian crime boss Raffaele Cutolo
 In the Shadow of Kilimanjaro (1986) – British-Kenyan natural horror film set in Kenya about the murderous rampage of ninety thousand starving baboons, killing humans and animals alike
 Jo Jo Dancer, Your Life Is Calling (1986) – biographical comedy drama film about Jo Jo Dancer, a popular stand-up comedian, who has severely burned himself while freebasing cocaine and alters his lifestyle after a near death experience
 Just Us (1986) – television film based on a true story and the autobiography by Gabrielle Carey, of the same name
 L'assassino è ancora tra noi ( The Killer is Still Among Us) (1986) – Italian horror film loosely based on the crimes of the Italian serial killer known as "the Monster of Florence"
 Liberty (1986) – television film, a largely fictionalized account of the construction of the Statue of Liberty
 The Mission (1986) – depiction of the experiences of 18th-century Jesuits in South America
 The Moro Affair (Italian: Il caso Moro) (1986) – Italian crime film about the kidnapping of Aldo Moro in 1978
 Nazi Hunter: The Beate Klarsfeld Story (1986) – made-for-television biographical drama film telling the true story on the life of Beate Klarsfeld, a German who documented the actions that took place during the Holocaust
 Night of the Pencils (1986) – Argentine historical drama film based on the non-fiction book by María Seoane and Héctor Ruiz Núñez, about the "Night of the pencils", it tells the story of seven students who were abducted in September 1976, during Argentina's last dictatorship (1976 - 1983), and subsequently disappeared
 Nobody's Child (1986) – made-for-television drama film based on the autobiographical account of the same title by Marie Balter who was sent to a mental institution aged sixteen
 River's Edge (1986) – crime drama film that follows a group of teenagers in a Northern California town who are forced to deal with their friend's murder of his girlfriend Jamie and the subsequent disposal of her body. The film's script is based on the 1981 murder of Marcy Renee Conrad in Milpitas, California
 Salvador (1986) – the story of an American journalist in El Salvador during the Salvadoran Civil War
 Samaritan: The Mitch Snyder Story (1986) – television film starring Martin Sheen as homeless activist Mitch Snyder
 The Sea and Poison (Japanese: Umi to Dokuyaku) (1986) – Japanese film based on a novel by Shusaku Endo, it tells the true story of downed American pilots in World War II who are vivisected by Japanese surgeons in medical experiments
 Sid and Nancy (1986) – based on the relationship of Sex Pistols bassist, Sid Vicious and his girlfriend, Nancy Spungen, Sid's drug use, and the controversy surrounding Nancy's death
 Stammheim – Die Baader-Meinhof-Gruppe vor Gericht ( Stammheim – The Baader-Meinhof Gang on Trial) (1986) – West German film that tells the story of the trial in the court of Stammheim Prison of the left-wing Baader-Meinhof Group
 Welcome in Vienna (German: Wohin und zurück - Teil 3: Welcome in Vienna) (1986) – Austrian drama film, the third part of Axel Corti's trilogy following Freddy, a Viennese Jew who emigrated to New York after Hitler's invasion
 Women of Valor (1986) – made-for-television war drama film about a group of American Army nurses that are captured by the Japanese in April 1942 and put in a prisoner-of-war camp in Bataan

1987 
 84 Charing Cross Road (1987) – based on the long-distance friendship that develops between American writer Helene Hanff and English bookseller Frank Doel through letters exchanged from 1949 to 1968
 A Place to Call Home (1987) – television film about Liz Gavin and her eleven children who relocate from Houston, Texas, to Australia
 A Winter Tan (1987) – Canadian drama film based on Maryse Holder, an ill-fated feminist author who met an untimely death in Acapulco
 After the Promise (1987) – television film about Elmer Jackson, a carpenter in a small Californian town in the 1930s, struggling to bring up 4 young boys after the death of his wife, who is horrified when the government places the boys into various foster homes and institutions, where they are subjected to abuse
 Blonde Dolly (1987) – Dutch drama film based on the real-life Hague prostitute, Sebilla Alida Johanna Niemans, better known as "Blonde Dolly", who was murdered in 1959. and whose murder remains unsolved
 Cry Freedom (1987) – based on the life of South African activist Steve Biko
 Empire of the Sun (1987) – epic coming-of-age war film based on J. G. Ballard's semi-autobiographical 1984 novel of the same name that tells the story of Jamie "Jim" Graham, a young boy who goes from living in a wealthy British family in Shanghai, to becoming a prisoner of war in a Japanese internment camp, during World War II
 Escape from Sobibor (1987) – British television film about the prison camp escape of Jewish prisoners from the Sobibór extermination camp
 Fight for Life (1987) – made-for-television drama film based on a true story of a family's fight for the life of their 6-year-old daughter who suffers from epileptic convulsions
 Full Metal Jacket (1987) – based on the book The Short-Timers, which tells of the experience of a soldier during the Vietnam War
 Gaby: A True Story (1987) – American-Mexican biographical drama film chronicling the lives of Gabriela Brimmer, a Mexican writer and disability rights activist, and her caretaker, Florencia Sánchez Morales
 Hachikō Monogatari (1987) – Japanese drama film, the tragic, true story about Hachikō, an Akita dog who was loyal to his master, Professor Ueno, even after Ueno's death
 Hamburger Hill (1987) – based on the events surrounding the Battle of Hamburger Hill during the Vietnam War
 The Impossible Spy (1987) – television film based on the true story of an Israeli civilian spy, Eli Cohen, who was recruited into Israel's secret intelligence agency (the Mossad) in the 1960s to become a spy in Damascus
 In Love and War (1987) – Vietnam war-based thriller/drama television film based on the true story of James Stockdale and Sybil Stockdale
 In the Mood (1987) – comedy film based on the true story of Sonny Wisecarver, a teenage casanova who has affairs and runs away to marry two older women, mothers themselves
 La Bamba (1987) – based on the real-life events affecting the lives of rock star Ritchie Valens, his half-brother Bob Morales, his girlfriend Donna Ludwig and their families
 The Last Emperor (1987) – based on the life of Chinese emperor Pu Yi
 The Lighthorsemen (1987) – Australian war film about the men of a World War I light horse unit involved in Sinai and Palestine Campaign's 1917 Battle of Beersheeba
 Macu, The Policeman's Woman (Spanish: Macu, la mujer del policía) (1987) – Venezuelan film based on the life of Argenis Rafael Ledezma, a Venezuelan police officer convicted of three homicides
 Matewan (1987) – John Sayles' film dramatizing the events of the Battle of Matewan, a coal miners' strike in 1920 in Matewan, a small town in the hills of West Virginia
 Murder Ordained (1987) – television film based on actual events that occurred in Emporia, Kansas, in 1983, the film tells the story of State Trooper John Rule, who investigates what appears to be a traffic accident resulting in the death of a local minister's wife
 Nayakan (1987) – based on the life of underworld don Varadarajan Mudaliar
 Promised Land (1987) – drama film that follows two high school acquaintances, Hancock, a basketball star, and Danny, a geek turned drifter, after they graduate
 Race for the Bomb (1987) – (French: La Course à la bombe) is a TV 3-parts miniseries about the Manhattan Project, starting from the initial stages of scientific discovery that led to the creation of the atomic bomb, discovery of the Ulam-Teller thermonuclear weapons design and ending with the beginning of the arms race
 Tudawali (1987) – made for television biographical film about Aboriginal Australian actor Robert Tudawali
 The Untouchables (1987) – loosely based on the 1930s crackdown on Chicago gangster Al Capone by the United States Department of the Treasury agent Eliot Ness
 Walker (1987) – American-Spanish historical/satirical film based on the life story of William Walker, the American filibuster who invaded and made himself president of Nicaragua
 Weeds (1987) – drama film about Lee Umstetter, a prison inmate who writes a play that catches the attention of a visiting reporter
 White Mischief (1987) – based on the events of Sir John "Jock" Delves Broughton and the Happy Valley set in 1940 during World War II

1988 
 A Dangerous Life (1988) – Australian television film about a love affair and the journey of a foreign correspondent set during the final years of Ferdinand Marcos' presidency in the Philippines, from the assassination of Benigno Aquino Jr. in 1983 to the People Power Revolution in 1986, as well as other key events that led to the ouster of Marcos
 A Man for All Seasons (1988) – made-for-television drama film about St. Thomas More based on the play of the same name by Robert Bolt, which was previously adapted in the Academy Award winning 1966 film A Man for All Seasons
 A Stoning in Fulham County (1988) – television film based on the true story of the murder of an Amish baby by a group of reckless teens in Indiana in 1979
 A World Apart (1988) – anti-apartheid drama film based on the lives of Slovo's parents, Ruth First and Joe Slovo
 The Accused (1988) – depiction of two trials for the 1983 gang rape of Cheryl Araujo at Big Dan's Tavern in New Bedford, Massachusetts
 Alega Gang: Public Enemy No.1 of Cebu (1988) – Philippine action crime film telling an account of the life of Ulysses "Boboy" Alega, and his descent into crime
 The Attic: The Hiding of Anne Frank (1988) – based on Miep Gies' book Anne Frank Remembered which documents her life in hiding during the German occupation of the Netherlands in World War II
 Bat*21 (1988) – war film adapted from the book by William C. Anderson, novelist and retired United States Air Force colonel, a dramatization based upon the rescue of a U.S. air navigator shot down behind enemy lines in Vietnam
 Bird (1988) – Forest Whitaker portrays the troubled life of jazz musician Charlie 'Bird' Parker
 Bloodsport (1988) – martial arts action film starring Jean-Claude Van Damme. The film is partly based on unverified claims made by martial artist Frank Dux
 Bloody Wednesday (1988) – based on the San Ysidro McDonald's massacre
 Buster (1988) – about the great train robber Buster Edwards, played by the rock drummer Phil Collins
 Camp de Thiaroye (1988) – Senegalese war-drama film depicting the Thiaroye massacre, which happened in Thiaroye, Dakar, in 1944
 Dadah Is Death (1988) – Australian film based on the Barlow and Chambers execution in Malaysia in 1986, originally broadcast as a 2-part mini series running 2 hours per part
 David (1988) – made-for-television drama film dramatizing the true story of a child named David Rothenberg who was burned by his father
 Dead Ringers (1988) – Canadian-American psychological thriller film based on the lives of Stewart and Cyril Marcus and on the novel Twins by Bari Wood and Jack Geasland, a "highly fictionalized" version of the Marcus' story
 The Deceivers (1988) – adventure film based on the 1952 John Masters novel of the same name regarding the murderous Thuggee of India
 Eight Men Out (1988) – based on the Black Sox scandal during the play of Major League Baseball's 1919 World Series
 Evil Angels (A Cry in the Dark outside Australia and New Zealand) (1988) – about an unlikeable woman convicted of her child's murder by the court of public opinion
 Gorillas in the Mist: The Story of Dian Fossey (1988) – drama film about the naturalist Dian Fossey and her work in Rwanda with mountain gorillas
 The Great Escape II: The Untold Story (1988) – made-for-television action-adventure drama film and a sequel to The Great Escape (1963), a former POW leads a special task force to hunt down the culprits responsible for carrying out the orders to murder 50 of the 76 escapees from Stalag Luft III
 Haunted Summer (1988) – a fictionalization of the summer of 1816 in which authors Lord Byron, Percy Shelley, and Mary Shelley, together with Lord Byron's ex-lover and his doctor, John William Polidori, spent in the isolated Villa Diodati by Lake Geneva
 In the Line of Duty: The F.B.I. Murders (1988) – made-for-television crime film about two former army buddies, Mike Platt and Bill Matix, who commit a series of murders and bank robberies in Miami, Florida, and a group of F.B.I. agents who are designated to carry out the investigation that eventually led to the 1986 FBI Miami shootout
 Jack the Ripper (1988) – Anglo-American co-production television film drama based on the notorious Jack the Ripper murder spree in Victorian London
 Judgment in Berlin (1988) – drama film based on the book Judgment in Berlin by Herbert J. Stern, about the Cold War true story of three East Berlin men who hijack a plane to escape to the West
 Mississippi Burning (1988) – based on the FBI investigation following the murders of Chaney, Goodman, and Schwerner
 Moonzund (1988) – Soviet war film based on Valentin Pikul's 1970 novel of the same name. The film's name is derived from the old name of West Estonian archipelago where the Battle of Moon Sound took place during World War I
 The Murder of Mary Phagan (1988) – two-part television miniseries dramatizing the true story of Leo Frank, a factory manager who was charged with murdering a 13-year-old girl, a factory worker named Mary Phagan, in Atlanta in 1913
 One Way Ticket (Spanish: Un pasaje de Ida) (1988) – Dominican drama film, a fictional retelling of the Regina Express tragedy, in which 22 Dominican stowaways died from suffocation in an attempt of illegal travel in September 1981
 The Rainbow Warrior Conspiracy (1988) – Australian-New Zealand drama film based on the Sinking of the Rainbow Warrior, a Greenpeace ship by French agents in Auckland, New Zealand in 1985
 The Riddle of the Stinson (1988) – Australian television film about the 1937 Airlines of Australia Stinson crash at Lamington, Queensland, Australia and the rescue of its survivors by local Queenslander Bernard O'Reilly
 Rowing with the Wind (Spanish: Remando al viento ) (1988) – Spanish film concerning the English writer Mary Shelley and her circle
 Running on Empty (1988) – drama film about a counterculture couple on the run from the FBI, and how one of their sons starts to break out of this fugitive lifestyle
 The Serpent and the Rainbow (1988) – horror film loosely based on the non-fiction book of the same name by ethnobotanist Wade Davis, wherein Davis recounted his experiences in Haiti investigating the story of Clairvius Narcisse, who was allegedly poisoned, buried alive, and revived with an herbal brew which produced what was called a zombie
 Shattered Innocence (1988) – made for television drama film about an eighteen year old former Kansas high school cheerleader who moves to L.A. to become a porn actress, and is drugged with cocaine before committing suicide at age twenty, based on the real-life accounts of the late Shauna Grant
 Stand and Deliver (1988) – based on the story of math teacher Jaime Escalante
 Story of Women (French: Une affaire de femmes) (1988) – French drama film based on the true story of Marie-Louise Giraud, guillotined on July 30, 1943, for having performed 27 abortions in the Cherbourg area, and the book by Francis Szpiner
 Superstar: The Karen Carpenter Story (1988) – experimental short biographical film that portrays the last 17 years of singer Karen Carpenter's life, as she struggled with anorexia
 The Taking of Flight 847: The Uli Derickson Story (1988) – made-for-television drama film based on the actual hijacking of TWA Flight 847 as seen through the eyes of Uli Derickson, the chief flight attendant
 Talk Radio (1988) – based on the assassination of radio host Alan Berg
 To Heal a Nation (1988) – television film that tells the true story of Jan Scruggs, a decorated veteran of the Vietnam War
 Too Young the Hero (1988) – made-for-television historical drama war film telling the true story of a 12-year-old boy who forges his mother's signature to join the United States Navy during World War II, it is based on the real life of Calvin Graham, who was the youngest American serviceman of the war
 Tucker: The Man and His Dream (1988) – the story of Preston Tucker, the maverick car designer and his ill-fated challenge to the auto industry with his revolutionary car concept, the 1948 Tucker Sedan
 The Woman He Loved (1988) – British made-for-television romantic drama film about the abdication of Edward VIII
 Young Guns (1988) – biographical Western film, a  retelling of the adventures of Billy the Kid during the Lincoln County War, which took place in New Mexico during 1877–78
 Young Toscanini (Italian: Il giovane Toscanini) (1988) – Italian-French biographical drama film starring C. Thomas Howell as Arturo Toscanini

1989 
 300 Miles to Heaven (Polish: 300 mil do nieba) (1989) – Polish drama film based on the true story of the Zieliński brothers, two teenagers who escaped from Communist Poland in 1985
 A City of Sadness (Chinese: Bēiqíng chéngshì) (1989) – Taiwanese historical drama film based on the February 28 Incident, telling the story of a family embroiled in the tragic "White Terror" that was wrought on the Taiwanese people by the Kuomintang government (KMT), during which tens of thousands of Taiwanese were rounded up, shot, and/or sent to prison
 A Cry for Help: The Tracey Thurman Story (1989) – television film based on the 1985 ruling Thurman v. City of Torrington, concerning a homemaker who sued the city police department in Torrington, Connecticut, claiming a failure of equal protection under the law against her abusive husband
 Blaze (1989) – comedy drama film based on the 1974 memoir Blaze Starr: My Life as Told to Huey Perry by Blaze Starr and Huey Perry, a highly fictionalized story of the latter years of Earl Long, a flamboyant Governor of Louisiana, brother of assassinated governor and U.S. Senator Huey P. Long and uncle of longtime U.S. Senator Russell Long
 Born on the Fourth of July (1989) – autobiography of Vietnam War veteran Ron Kovic
 Casualties of War (1989) – based on the events of the incident on Hill 192 in 1966 during the Vietnam War
 Chattahoochee (1989) – drama film based on the real-life experiences of Chris Calhoun, who met screenwriter James Hicks, who then wrote a script based on his internment in a Florida state mental institution
 Cross of Fire (1989) – television miniseries based on the rape and murder of Madge Oberholtzer by D. C. Stephenson, a highly successful leader of the Indiana branch of Ku Klux Klan
 Drugstore Cowboy (1989) – crime drama film based on an autobiographical novel by James Fogle
 Everybody's Baby: The Rescue of Jessica McClure (1989) – based on the story of Jessica McClure, an 18-month-old toddler who was stuck in a well in the backyard of her home in Midland, Texas, for 58 hours
 Fat Man and Little Boy (1989) – war film following the Manhattan Project, the secret Allied endeavor to develop the first nuclear weapons during World War II
 The Favorite (1989) – Swiss-American drama film based on the unsubstantiated story of Aimée du Buc de Rivéry (1768-1817) that takes place at the dawn of the 19th century
 Fire and Rain (1989) – made-for-television disaster film based on the Delta Air Lines Flight 191 plane crash at Dallas/Fort Worth International Airport on August 2, 1985, as depicted in Fire and Rain: A Tragedy in American Aviation (1986) by Jerome Greer Chandler
 Glory (1989) – based on the 54th Massachusetts Volunteer Infantry during the American Civil War
 Great Balls of Fire! (1989) – American biographical film starring Dennis Quaid as rockabilly pioneer Jerry Lee Lewis
 The Hijacking of the Achille Lauro (1989) – made-for-television drama film about the Achille Lauro hijacking
 Hiver 54, l'abbé Pierre (1989) – French film that recounts the efforts by a parish priest, Father Pierre, to gain assistance from the government for the homeless, who after World War II were living in poverty and suffering from one of the coldest winters on record
 I Know My First Name Is Steven (1989) – true story of Steven Stayner's life after being kidnapped at the age of seven and held with his captor and sexually abused. When his captor kidnapped another younger boy, he took the boy to the police station only to be found by his own parents
 Kornblumenblau (1989) – Polish drama film about Tadeusz Wyczyński, a young musician who uses his talents to fight for dignity and survival at Auschwitz Concentration Camp
 Kuduz (1989) – Yugoslav film set in SR Bosnia and Herzegovina and based on the true story of the outlaw Junuz Kečo
 Lean on Me (1989) – based on the true story of Joe Louis Clark, a principal at Paterson, New Jersey's Eastside High School who gained public attention in the 1980s for his unconventional and controversial disciplinary measures
 My Left Foot (1989) – the story of Christy Brown, a disabled Irish writer who could type only with the toes on his left foot
 The Littlest Victims (1989) – biographical drama about Dr. James Oleske, the first U.S. physician to diagnose AIDS in children during the epidemic's early years when it was widely thought to be spread only though homosexual sex
 The Preppie Murder (1989) – television film based on the events of a murder committed by Robert Chambers, nicknamed the Preppie Killer
 Resurrected (1989) – based on the story of the British soldier Philip Williams, who is presumed dead and left behind in the Falkland Islands but is accused of desertion when he reappears seven weeks after the end of the Falklands War
 Save and Protect (Russian: Spasi i sokhrani) (1989) – inspired by Flaubert's Madame Bovary, it depicts the decline of a childlike woman as she engages in adultery and falls into crippling debt
 Scandal (1989) – British drama film, a fictionalized account of the Profumo affair that rocked the government of British prime minister Harold Macmillan
 The Seventh Continent (German: Der siebente Kontinent) (1989) – Austrian drama film based on a news article about the last years of an Austrian family who lead routine urban middle-class lives, with hopes of escaping to Australia to start a new life, but suddenly decide to destroy themselves without any apparent reason
 Small Sacrifices (1989) – American television film based on the best-selling true crime book by Ann Rule of the same name about Diane Downs and the murder and attempted murder of her three children
 Unconquered (1989) – made-for-television drama film based on the struggles of Richmond Flowers, Sr., the Alabama attorney general who opposed many of Governor George Wallace's segregationist policies in the 1960s, and his son, star athlete Richmond Flowers, Jr.
 Wired (1989) – adaptation of Bob Woodward's book of the same name about the life of John Belushi

1990s

1990 
 A Dangerous Man: Lawrence After Arabia (1990) – British television film depicting the experiences of T. E. Lawrence and Emir Faisal of the Hejaz at the Paris Peace Conference after the end of the First World War
 A Killing in a Small Town (1990) – television film based on the story of Wylie, Texas, housewife Candy Montgomery's murder of Betty Gore in 1980
 After the Shock (1990) – television film about the aftermath of the 1989 Loma Prieta earthquake that hit San Francisco on October 17, 1989
 An Angel at My Table (1990) – drama film based on Janet Frame's three autobiographies, To the Is-Land (1982), An Angel at My Table (1984), and The Envoy from Mirror City (1984)
 Anything to Survive (1990) – disaster survival film loosely based on the true story of the Wortman family of Prince of Wales Island, Alaska
 Awakenings (1990) – drama film based on British neurologist Oliver Sacks's memoir of the same title, about his discovery of the beneficial effects of the drug L-DOPA, which he administered to catatonic patients, who awakened after decades of catatonia
 Call Me Mr. Brown (1990) – Australian movie based on the Australian Great Plane Robbery of 1971
 Captive of the Desert (French: La captive du désert) (1990) – French drama film based in part on the experiences of Françoise Claustre who was captured by Chadian rebels in 1974, later joined by her husband, and the pair finally released in 1977
 Challenger (1990) – television film based on the events surrounding the Space Shuttle Challenger disaster
 Chicago Joe and the Showgirl (1990) – British crime drama film inspired by the real-life Hulten/Jones murder case of 1944, otherwise known as the Cleft Chin Murder
 China Cry (1990) – biographical film set during the rise of the communist state in China, based on the book by Nora Lam, about a young girl, Sung Neng Yee, who is taken to a labour camp, overseen by the sadistic Colonel Cheng
 Cyrano de Bergerac (1990) – about French novelist, playwright, epistolarian and duelist, Cyrano de Bergerac
 The Dreamer of Oz: The L. Frank Baum Story (1990) – television film about L. Frank Baum, the author of The Wonderful Wizard of Oz
 Ek Doctor Ki Maut (1990) – Indian film based on the life of Dr. Subhash Mukhopadhyay, an Indian Physician who pioneered the IVF treatment just around the same time when another leading scientist Dr. Robert Edwards was conducting separate experiments in England
 Europa Europa (German: Hitlerjunge Salomon) (1990) – German film based on the true story of author and motivational speaker Solomon Perel's life
 Fall from Grace (1990) – television film about the lives of Jim Bakker and his then-wife, Tammy Faye Bakker, during the 1980s, and depicting the events that led to the PTL scandal and the Bakkers' subsequent downfall
 Forbidden Nights (1990) – made-for-television drama film based on the article The Rocky Course of Love in China, set in Red China in 1979, Judith Shapiro, an American teacher who falls in love with Liang Heng, a Chinese radical, trying to bring political reform to his homeland. She puts all her wishes and dreams away to fit into his ideals, but soon, trouble starts to come
 GoodFellas (1990) – based on the book Wiseguy by Nicholas Pileggi, the true story of New York City mobster Henry Hill
 Henry & June (1990) – based on the book Henry and June by Anais Nin, the true story of the Millers, Anais Nin and Ian Hugo
 Hiroshima: Out of the Ashes (1990) – made-for-television historical war drama film about the Atomic bombings of Hiroshima
 I Love You to Death (1990) – black comedy film loosely based on an attempted murder that happened in 1983, in Allentown, Pennsylvania, where Frances Toto repeatedly tried to kill her husband, Anthony
 I, the Worst of All (Spanish: Yo, la peor de todas) (1990) – Argentinian film, a biopic on the life of Juana Inés de la Cruz. It was based on Octavio Paz's Sor Juana: Or, the Traps of Faith
 Judgment (1990) – television film about a Louisiana priest accused of molesting young parishioners, and of the family of one of his victims, caught between their loyalty to their son and to their Church
 The Krays (1990) – a trendy take on the criminally insane East End gangsters the Kray twins, who enjoyed a brief, black-humored celebrity during London's Swinging Sixties
 Max and Helen (1990) – drama film based on the 1982 book Max and Helen by Simon Wiesenthal, about his 1962 prosecution of the head of a German factory whom he learns was a murderous labor camp commandant
 Mayumi (1990) – South Korean film based on the bombing of Korean Air Flight 858
 Memphis Belle (1990) – British-American war drama film, a fictionalization of the 1944 documentary Memphis Belle: A Story of a Flying Fortress about the 25th and last mission of an American Boeing B-17 Flying Fortress bomber, the Memphis Belle, based in England during World War II
 Miracle Landing (1990) – made-for-television drama film based on an in-flight accident aboard Aloha Airlines Flight 243 that occurred in April 1988
 Mountains of the Moon (1990) – biographical film depicting the 1857–1858 journey of Richard Francis Burton and John Hanning Speke in their expedition to Central Africa which culminated in Speke's discovery of the source of the Nile River and led to a bitter rivalry between the two men
 The Long Walk Home (1990) – historical drama film based on the Montgomery bus boycott (1955–1956)
 Murder in Mississippi (1990) – television film which dramatized the last weeks of civil rights activists Michael "Mickey" Schwerner, Andrew Goodman and James Chaney, and the events leading up to their disappearance and subsequent murder during Freedom Summer in 1964
 My Father's Glory (French: La Gloire de mon père) (1990) – French film based on the autobiographical novel My Father's Glory by Marcel Pagnol
 My Mother's Castle (French: Le château de ma mère) (1990) – French film, a sequel to My Father's Glory
 The Nasty Girl (German: Das schreckliche Mädchen) (1990) – West German drama film based on the true story of Anna Rosmus (named Sonja Rosenberger in the film), a German high school student, who investigates her town's Nazi past, when the community turns against her
 Pacific Heights (1990) – psychological horror film based on a true story about a couple who rent out an apartment to a crazy scam man
 Reversal of Fortune (1990) – the true story of the unexplained coma of socialite Sunny von Bülow, the subsequent attempted murder trial, and the eventual acquittal of her husband, Claus von Bülow, who was defended by Alan Dershowitz
 The Rose and the Jackal (1990) – made-for-television Western adventure film revolving around Union agent Allan Pinkerton, who falls in love with female spy Rose O'Neal Greenhow
 Secret Weapon (1990) – American-Australian film, the true story of Mordechai Vanunu, the Israeli nuclear technician who revealed to the world his country's nuclear weapons capabilities
 Shoot to Kill (1990) – a four-hour drama reconstruction of the events that led to the 1984–86 Stalker Inquiry into the shooting of six terrorist suspects in Northern Ireland in 1982 by a specialist unit of the Royal Ulster Constabulary 
 Silent Scream (1990) – biopic film about convicted murderer Larry Winters
 Sudie and Simpson (1990) – television film based on Sarah Flanigan Carter's autobiographical novel about growing up in World War II-era Georgia, Sudie Harrington, a feisty twelve-year-old, befriends Simpson, a gentle black man accused of impropriety with a child
 Too Young to Die? (1990) – television film touching on the debate concerning the death penalty, loosely based on the true story of Attina Marie Cannaday
 Vincent & Theo (1990) – the intense relationship between an art dealer Vincent van Gogh and his alienated older brother Theo
 Voices Within: The Lives of Truddi Chase (1990) – miniseries based on When Rabbit Howls, the autobiography of Truddi Chase, a woman who was diagnosed with dissociative identity disorder who allegedly had 92 separate personalities
 Voyage of Terror: The Achille Lauro Affair (1990) – American-German-Italian-French made-for-television action-drama film based on the 1985 Achille Lauro hijacking
 White Hunter Black Heart (1990) – based on the location filming of The African Queen in 1951

1991 
 29th Street (1991) – comedy drama film, adapted from a story by Frank Pesce and James Franciscus, about Frank Pesce Jr. who wins the lottery in 1976
 Absolute Strangers (1991) – made-for-television drama film based on the true story of a husband's controversial decision to have his wife undergo an abortion to aid her recovery after a head-trauma accident had left her comatose
 American Friends (1991) – British comedy film about Francis Ashby, a senior Oxford professor on holiday in the Swiss Alps in 1861. The plot was based on a real-life incident involving Michael Palin's great-grandfather, Edward Palin
 Billy Bathgate (1991) – biographical gangster film starring Dustin Hoffman as real-life gangster Dutch Schultz
 Black Robe (1991) – tells the story of the first contacts between the Huron Indians of Quebec and the Jesuit missionaries from France who came to convert them to Catholicism, and ended up delivering them into the hands of their enemies
 The Boys from St. Petri (Danish: Drengene fra Sankt Petri) (1991) – Danish World War II film inspired by the activities of the Churchill Club
 Bugsy (1991) – the glamorized and sanitized story of mobster Bugsy Siegel, the putative father of the Las Vegas Strip
 Cabeza de Vaca (1991) – Mexican film about the adventures of Álvar Núñez Cabeza de Vaca (c. 1490 – c. 1557), an early Spanish explorer, as he traversed what later became the Southeast United States
 Charuga (1991) – Yugoslav film based on the novel by Ivan Kušan, it tells a true story about legendary Slavonian bandit Jovo Stanisavljević Čaruga
 The Chase (1991) – crime drama television film based on the true story of American bank robber Phillip Hutchinson, who robbed a bank, killed a cop and took a man hostage in a 1988 rampage in Denver, Colorado
 Chernobyl: The Final Warning (1991) – made-for-television disaster drama film chronicling the Chernobyl disaster
 Cry in the Wild: The Taking of Peggy Ann (1991) – television film based on the true story of the abduction of Peggy Ann Bradnick by an ex-convict and ex-mental patient William Diller Hollenbaugh which took place in Shade Gap, Pennsylvania on May 11, 1966
 Deadly Intentions... Again? (1991) – made-for-television thriller film and a sequel to the 1985 film Deadly Intentions about Dr. Charles Raynor
 Dillinger (1991) – television film based on the actual events of the pursuit of American bank robber John Dillinger during the 1930s
 The Doctor (1991) – drama film loosely based on Dr. Edward Rosenbaum's 1988 autobiographical book A Taste of My Own Medicine, about his experience with throat cancer
 The Doors (1991) – based on the life of Jim Morrison, the lead singer for the American rock band The Doors before his death in Paris
 The Haunted (1991) – made-for-television haunted house film depicting the events surrounding the Smurl haunting
 Hear My Song (1991) – comedy film based on the story of Irish tenor Josef Locke
 Il Capitano: A Swedish Requiem (Swedish: Il Capitano) (1991) – Swedish-Finnish biographical drama film about the 1988 Åmsele murders, where a family of three was murdered by Juha Valjakkala over a stolen bicycle
 In a Child's Name (1991) – crime drama mini-series about a custody battle in the state of Indiana for a boy named Andrew Taylor
 The Inner Circle (1991) – drama film by telling the story of Joseph Stalin's private projectionist and KGB officer Ivan Sanchin (real name Alex Ganchin) between 1939 and 1953, the year Stalin died
 Impromptu (1991) – British-American period drama film about the romance between Frédéric Chopin and George Sand in 1830s France
 JFK (1991) – loosely based on New Orleans DA Jim Garrison's late-1960s prosecution of defendant Clay Shaw – in addition to pieces of a half-dozen other conspiracy theories – in the John F. Kennedy assassination
 Let Him Have It (1991) – the story of the murder of a London policeman killed during an attempted break in by Christopher Craig and Derek Bentley; covers the subsequent trial and execution of what has turned out to be an innocent man
 Line of Fire: The Morris Dees Story (1991) – drama film based on the true story of Morris Dees, a civil rights lawyer from Alabama, whose Southern Poverty Law Center battles neo-Nazis and the Ku Klux Klan
 Love, Lies and Murder (1991) – two-part miniseries based on the 1985 murder of Linda Bailey Brown and Ann Rule's book If You Really Loved Me
 Lovers (Spanish: Amantes) (1991) – Spanish film noir concerning a widow who engages in blackmailing and persuades a young man to kill his wife
 Mobsters (1991) – crime film detailing the creation of The Commission. Set in New York City, taking place from 1917 to 1931, it is a semi-fictitious account of the rise of Charles "Lucky" Luciano, Meyer Lansky, Frank Costello, and Benjamin "Bugsy" Siegel
 Murder in New Hampshire: The Pamela Wojas Smart Story (1991) – made-for-television crime drama film based on the true story of Pamela Smart seducing one of her 15-year-old students into sex and to murdering her husband, Gregg Smart, in Derry, New Hampshire
 Never Forget (1991) – made-for-television drama film about Mel Mermelstein, an American holocaust survivor who confronted a Holocaust denial organization's lies in court
 Not Without My Daughter (1991) – the story of American author and public speaker Betty Mahmoody, who was abducted and held hostage with her daughter in Iran
 One Man's War (1991) – television drama film set in Paraguay in 1976, under the dictatorship of General Alfredo Stroessner, it is based on the true story of Joel Filártiga who sought justice for his son's death at the hands of Stroessner's secret police
 Rose Against the Odds (1991) – Australian mini series about the life of Lionel Rose
 Switched at Birth (1991) – the true story of Kimberly Mays and Arlena Twigg, babies switched soon after birth in a Florida hospital in 1978
 Walerjan Wrobel's Homesickness (German: Das Heimweh des Walerjan Wróbel) (1991) – German drama film based on the true story of sixteen-year old Walerjan who is removed from his close-knit Polish family in 1941 by the German occupation
 Walking a Tightrope (French: Les Équilibristes) (1991) – French drama film about Marcel Spadice, a poet who meets Franz-Ali Aoussine, a valet who dreams of becoming a great tightrope walker
 Wife, Mother, Murderer (1991) – made-for-television drama film concerning Alabama murderer Marie Hilley
 Wild Hearts Can't Be Broken (1991) – drama film concerning Sonora Webster Carver, a rider of diving horses
 Without Warning: The James Brady Story (1991) – television film about James Brady, who was shot during the 1981 attempted assassination of Ronald Reagan

1992 
 1492: Conquest of Paradise (1992) – the very sanitized story of Taino homelands of by the Italian colonialist Christopher Columbus and the effect this had on the indigenous peoples of the Americas
 A Killer Among Friends (1992) – made-for-television film about a mother grieving for her murdered daughter who sets out to find the killer, based on the real life murder of Michele Avila
 A League of Their Own (1992) – based on the All-American Girls Professional Baseball League during World War II
 A Mother's Right: The Elizabeth Morgan Story (1992) – television film chronicling the story behind the Elizabeth Morgan case, in which a woman is put on trial when she sends her daughter to New Zealand to live with her grandparents, after her ex-husband is not found guilty for abusing their daughter, of which she suspects him
 A Private Matter (1992) – made-for-television drama film based on the true 1962 story of Sherri Finkbine, a resident of Phoenix, Arizona in the first trimester of her fifth pregnancy
 A Thousand Heroes (a.k.a. Crash Landing: The Rescue of Flight 232) (1992) – television film about the crash landing of United Airlines flight 232 at Sioux City, IA in 1989
 Amy Fisher: My Story (1992) – made-for-television drama film based on Amy Fisher's affair with Joey Buttafuoco, and her conviction for aggravated assault for shooting Buttafuoco's wife
 The Babe (1992) – biographical drama film about the life of famed baseball player Babe Ruth
 Baby Snatcher (1992) – television film based on the kidnapping of Rachael Ann White
 Bed of Lies (1992) – made-for-television drama film based on the non-fiction book, Deadly Blessing, which tells the story of Vickie Moore, a low born Texas waitress, who murders her husband Price Daniel Jr.
 Bonnie & Clyde: The True Story (1992) – television film about American criminal couple  Bonnie and Clyde
 The Boys of St. Vincent (1992) – Canadian television miniseries based on child sexual abuse scandals that took place at the Mount Cashel Orphanage in St. John's, Newfoundland
 Chaplin (1992) – based on the life of British comedian-actor Charlie Chaplin
 Child of Rage (1992) – biographical drama television film based on the true story of Beth Thomas, who had severe behavioral problems as a result of being sexually abused as a child
 Daens (1992) - Belgian period drama based upon a novel by Louis Paul Boon, telling the true story of Adolf Daens, a Catholic priest in Aalst, Belgium, who strives to improve the miserable working conditions in the local factories
 De Bunker (1992) – Dutch drama film that tells the true story of Dutch resistance fighter Gerrit Kleinveld
 Dead Ahead: The Exxon Valdez Disaster (1992) – drama film depicting the Exxon Valdez oil spill disaster off the coast of Alaska in March 1989
 Frankie's House (1992) – British-Australian TV miniseries based on the biography of British photographer Tim Page, especially focusing on his relationship with Sean Flynn - the son of Errol Flynn - during the Vietnam War
 Grave Secrets: The Legacy of Hilltop Drive (1992) – television horror film supposedly based on real events, about a family that experiences disturbing supernatural phenomena after they find out that their house is built on land formerly used as a cemetery
 Hoffa (1992) – based on the life of the Teamsters Union leader Jimmy Hoffa before his disappearance in 1975
 In the Best Interest of the Children (1992) – made-for-television fact-based drama film about a woman struggling with manic-depression while raising her five children
 Jonathan: The Boy Nobody Wanted (1992) – made-for-television biographical drama film about Jonathan, a boy with down-syndrome who is left in an institute, and an employee of the institute who battles the system and the parents to have custody over him
 The Last of His Tribe (1992) – made-for-television drama film based on the book Ishi in Two Worlds by Theodora Kroeber which relates the experiences of her husband Alfred L. Kroeber who made friends with Ishi, thought to be the last of his people, the Yahi tribe
 Lorenzo's Oil (1992) – based on the true story of Augusto and Michaela Odone, two parents in a relentless search for a cure for their son Lorenzo's adrenoleukodystrophy (ALD)
 Malcolm X (1992) – epic biographical drama film about the African-American activist Malcolm X
 Newsies (a.k.a. The News Boys) (1992) – musical drama film about the New York City newsboys' strike of 1899
 Pugoy – Hostage: Davao (1992) – Filipino action film based on the 1989 Davao hostage crisis
 Requiem pro panenku ( Requiem for a Doll) (1992) – Czech psychological thriller / drama film inspired by a real-life tragedy that cost the lives of 26 mentally disabled girls
 Schtonk! (1992) – German satirical film which retells the story of the 1983 Hitler Diaries hoax
 Something to Live for: The Alison Gertz Story (1992) – television film based on the life of prominent AIDS activist Alison Gertz
 Stay the Night (1992) – television crime-drama mini-series about a teenage boy who has a romantic affair with an older, married woman who together plot to murder her husband
 Taking Back My Life: The Nancy Ziegenmeyer Story (1992) – made-for-television drama film about Nancy Ziegenmeyer, a rape victim who spoke out about her experiences and created the notion that rape and sexual assault are never the victim's fault
 Thunderheart (1992) – Neo-Western mystery film loosely based on events relating to the Wounded Knee incident in 1973
 To Catch a Killer (1992) – two-part television film based on the true story of the pursuit of American serial killer John Wayne Gacy
 The Waterdance (1992) – drama film, a semi-autobiographical story about a young fiction writer who becomes tetraplegic fully paralyzed in a hiking accident and works to rehabilitate his body and mind at a rehabilitation center
 Willing to Kill: The Texas Cheerleader Story (1992) – television film based on the story of Wanda Holloway

1993 
 A Bronx Tale (1993) – crime drama film adapted from Chazz Palminteri's 1989 autobiographical play of the same name, it tells the coming of age story of an Italian-American boy, Calogero, who, after encountering a local Mafia boss, is torn between the temptations of organized crime, racism in his community, and the values of his honest, hardworking father
 A Matter of Justice (1993) – television film based on the murder of Marine Chris Randall Brown
 A Place to Be Loved (1993) – television film about Gregory Kingsley, a boy who is abused by his father and placed with social services by his mother, he ends up taking his mother to court, to have her parental rights revoked, in hopes of being adopted by his foster family
 Alive (1993) – based on the Piers Paul Read book that tells the story of the crash of Uruguayan Air Force Flight 571 in 1972
 The Amy Fisher Story (1993) – television film dramatizing the events surrounding Amy Fisher's teenage affair with Joey Buttafuoco and her conviction for aggravated assault in the shooting of Buttafuoco's wife Mary Jo
 And the Band Played On (1993) – television film docudrama adapted from the book of the same title by Randy Shilts, chronicling the discovery and spread of HIV and AIDS, with emphasis on political infighting and government indifference to what was then perceived as a specifically gay disease
 The Ballad of Little Jo (1993) – Western film inspired by the true story of a society woman who tries to escape the stigma of bearing a child out of wedlock by going out to the West, and living disguised as a man
 Barbarians at the Gate (1993) – television movie based upon the 1989 book by Bryan Burrough and John Helyar, about the leveraged buyout (LBO) of RJR Nabisco
 Benito (Italian: Il Giovane Mussolini) (1993) – Italian TV film regarding the story of Benito Mussolini's early rise to power in the Socialist International and his relationship with Angelica Balabanoff
 Beyond the Law (1993) – based on the real-life story of an undercover DEA Agent infiltrating a notorious biker gang involved with drug and gun running
 Black Widow Murders: The Blanche Taylor Moore Story (1993) – drama film based on the 1993 book Preacher's Girl by Jim Schutze, about the true story of a North Carolina woman who murdered her first husband and a lover with arsenic
 The Blue Exile (Turkish: Mavi sürgün) (1993) –  Turkish drama film depicting writer Cevat Şakir Kabaağaçlı's early years in Bodrum
 Blood In Blood Out (a.k.a. Bound by Honor) (1993) – epic crime drama film following the intertwining lives of three Chicano relatives from 1972 to 1984, based on the true life experiences of poet and screenwriter Jimmy Santiago Baca
 Cannibal! The Musical (a.k.a. Alferd Packer: The Musical) (1993) – independent musical black comedy film, a heavily fabricated version on the true story of Alferd Packer and the sordid details of the trip from Utah to Colorado that left his five fellow travelers dead and partially eaten
 Casualties of Love: The Long Island Lolita Story (1993) – the third made-for-television film based on the story of Amy Fisher and Joey Buttafuoco
 Cool Runnings (1993) – based on the true story of the first Jamaican bobsled team trying to make it to the 1988 Winter Olympics
 Dead Before Dawn (1993) – television film based on a true event involving the publicized mid-1980s bitter divorce of Linda and Robert Edelman
 Deadly Relations (1993) – television film based on the true crime book Deadly Relations: A True Story of Murder in a Suburban Family by Carol Donahue and Shirley Hall, Donahue and Hall are the daughters of Leonard Fagot, a New Orleans attorney whose obsession with controlling his daughters led to him murdering their husbands for hefty insurance pay outs
 Desperate Rescue: The Cathy Mahone Story (1993) – made-for-television drama film based on a true story of a woman who tries to rescue her 7-year-old daughter from the Middle East after she is abducted by her Jordanian father
 Dragon: The Bruce Lee Story (1993) – biographical drama film that follows the life of actor and martial artist Bruce Lee
 The Ernest Green Story (1993) – made-for-television biographical film which follows the true story of Ernest Green (Morris Chestnut) and eight other African-American high-school students (dubbed the "Little Rock Nine") as they embark on their historic journey to integrate Little Rock Central High School in Little Rock, Arkansas, in 1957
 Fire in the Sky (1993) – biopic science fiction mystery film based on Travis Walton's book The Walton Experience, which describes an alleged extraterrestrial abduction
 Gatica, el mono (1993) – Argentine drama film, a biopic of Argentine boxer José María Gatica
 Geronimo: An American Legend (1993) – historical western film, a fictionalized account of the Apache Wars and how First Lieutenant Charles B. Gatewood convinced Apache leader Geronimo to surrender in 1886
 Gettysburg (1993) – based on the story of the Battle of Gettysburg
 Gross Misconduct (1993) – Australian thriller film based on the play Assault With a Deadly Weapon which was written in 1969 by Lance Peters. It had been suggested by a 1955 scandal in Hobart, where university professor Sydney Orr had been sacked from his job on grounds of gross misconduct
 Heaven & Earth (1993) – based on the experiences of Le Ly Hayslip during the Vietnam War
 I Can Make You Love Me (1993) – made-for-television psychological horror film based on the real-life story of American mass murderer Richard Farley, a former employee of ESL Incorporated whose romantic obsession and subsequent stalking of co-worker Laura Black culminated in the mass murder of several co-workers at ESL's headquarters in California
 In the Line of Duty: Ambush in Waco (1993) – made-for-television action drama film portraying the events leading up to and at the start of the Waco siege
 In the Name of the Father (1993) – biographical courtroom drama film based on the true story of the Guildford Four, four people falsely convicted of the 1974 Guildford pub bombings, which killed four off-duty British soldiers and a civilian
 Jonah Who Lived in the Whale (Italian: Jona che visse nella balena) (1993) – Italian-French drama film based on the autobiographical novel by the writer Jona Oberski entitled Childhood, focused on the drama of the Holocaust
 Judgment Day: The John List Story (1993) – made-for-television crime drama film, a fictionalized version of the crime of John List, who killed his mother, wife, and three children in 1971, before assuming a new identity, and eluding capture, for over 17 years
 Just a Matter of Duty (German: Die Denunziantin) (1993) – German drama film about a German war crimes trial following World War II
 Life with Billy (1993) – Canadian television film based on the non-fiction book of the same name by Brian Vallée
 Lost in the Wild (a.k.a. Nurses on the Line: The Crash of Flight 7) (1993) – made-for-television drama film about a plane that plummets from the sky above the jungles of Mexico
 M. Butterfly (1993) – romantic drama film based on David Henry Hwang's play of the same name, loosely based on true events about a French diplomat assigned to Beijing, China, in the 1960s
 Money for Nothing (1993) – biographical comedy crime film based on the 1986 Philadelphia Inquirer article "Finders Keepers" by Mark Bowden. The film is loosely based on the life of Joey Coyle (Cusack), who, in 1981, discovered $1.2 million that had fallen out of an armored van in Philadelphia, Pennsylvania
 Murder in the Heartland (1993) – two-part television miniseries based on the 1957–58 murder spree carried out by 19-year-old Charles Starkweather and 14-year old Caril Ann Fugate throughout Nebraska and Wyoming
 Ordeal in the Arctic (1993) –  television film depicting the accident of Canadian Forces Lockheed CC-130E Hercules (130322), from 435 Transport and Rescue Squadron (a part of Operation Boxtop), that struck a rocky slope and crashed on Ellesmere Island, October 30, 1991
 The Positively True Adventures of the Alleged Texas Cheerleader-Murdering Mom (1993) – television film based on the story of Wanda Holloway
 Precious Victims (1993) – television film based on the book of the same name by Charles Bosworth Jr. and Don W. Weber
 The Puppetmaster (Mandarin: Xi meng ren sheng) (1993) – Taiwanese film about the story of Li Tian-lu, who becomes a master puppeteer but is faced with demands to turn his skills to propaganda during Japanese-ruled Taiwan from pre-1896 to the end of World War II in 1945
 The Rainbow Warrior (1993) – made-for-television drama film based on the true story of the Greenpeace ship Rainbow Warrior, which was sunk in Waitematā Harbour in Auckland, New Zealand on 10 July 1985 by French DGSE operatives, when it was preparing for a Pacific voyage to protest against French nuclear testing
 Rudy (1993) – based on the story of Notre Dame football walk-on Daniel "Rudy" Ruettiger
 Sakay (1993) – Filipino historical drama film portraying the latter part of the life of Filipino patriot and hero Macario Sakay, who was declared an outlaw and a criminal for continuing hostilities against the United States after the "official" end of the Philippine–American War
 Sardar (1993) – based on life of Sardar Vallabhbhai Patel, one of India's greatest freedom fighters and the first Home Minister of India
 Scattered Dreams (1993) – made for TV drama film about a couple that get arrested for a crime they didn't commit
 Schindler's List (1993) – adapted from the book Schindler's Ark by Thomas Keneally about Oskar Schindler and his actions to save over 1,000 Jews from the Holocaust
 Searching for Bobby Fischer (1993) – drama film based on the life of prodigy chess player Joshua Waitzkin
 Shadowlands (1993) – biographical film about the relationship between writer and Oxford academic C.S. Lewis and American poet Joy Davidman, their marriage, and her death from cancer
 Six Degrees of Separation (1993) – comedy drama film inspired by the real-life story of David Hampton, a con man and robber who convinced a number of people in the 1980s that he was the son of actor Sidney Poitier
 Tango Feroz (Spanish: Tango Feroz: la leyenda de Tanguito) (1993) – Argentine drama musical film loosely based in the life of Tanguito, one of the first artists of Argentine rock
 Telling Secrets (a.k.a. Contract for Murder) (1993) – television film based on the true story of Joy Aylor, who plots the murder of her adulterous husband's mistress
 This Boy's Life (1993) – biographical coming-of-age drama film based on the memoir of the same name by American author Tobias Wolff
 Tombstone (1993) – story of Wyatt Earp
 The Trust (1993) – depicting the story of businessman William Marsh Rice's mysterious death in 1900 and the people involved with it
 What's Love Got to Do with It (1993) – biographical film based on the life of American-born singer Tina Turner
 Wide-Eyed and Legless (1993) – made-for-TV British drama film based on the 1989 book Diana's Story by Deric Longden, that tells the story of his marriage to his wife, Diana, who contracts a chronic, degenerative illness that medical officials were unable to understand at the time

1994 
 8 Seconds (1994) – based on the story of American rodeo legend Lane Frost who died from injuries sustained riding a bull at the 1989 Cheyenne Frontier Days Rodeo
 A Friend to Die For (a.k.a. Death of a Cheerleader) (1994) – psychological thriller television film based on the real-life murder of Kirsten Costas, who was killed by her classmate, Bernadette Protti, in 1984
 A Time to Heal (1994) – television film based on the true story of a young mother's painful recovery from a stroke 
 Against the Wall (1994) – action historical drama television film based on the 1971 Attica Prison riot
 And Then There Was One (1994) – television film about the true story of a family dealing with AIDS
 Andre (1994) – comedy drama film about a child's encounter with a seal, an adaptation of the book A Seal Called Andre, which in turn was based on a true story
 Armed and Innocent (1994) – crime/thriller made-for-TV film based on the true story of an eleven-year-old boy who left home alone and kills two intruders in self defense
 Assault at West Point: The Court-Martial of Johnson Whittaker (1994) – made-for-TV drama film about Johnson Chesnut Whittaker, one of the first black cadets at West Point, and the trial that followed an assault he suffered in 1880
 The Babymaker: The Dr. Cecil Jacobson Story (1994) – made-for-television drama film based on the true story of Cecil Jacobson, who used his own sperm to impregnate patients, without informing them
 Bandit Queen (1994) – Indian biographical film based on the life of female rights activist, bandit and politician Phoolan Devi
 The Burning Season (1994) – television film chronicling Chico Mendes' fight to protect the rainforest
 Cobb (1994) – biographical film starring Tommy Lee Jones as baseball player Ty Cobb, based on a book by Al Stump
 Cries from the Heart (1994) – made-for-television drama film about a seven-year-old autistic boy who has trouble with verbalization but a real talent for technology, who uses a computer to plead for help after being molested at school
 The Diary of Evelyn Lau (1994) – Canadian television film about Evelyn Lau, a teenager who runs away from home and becomes a drug-addicted prostitute
 Doomsday Gun (1994) – television film dramatizing the life of Canadian supergun designer Dr. Gerald Bull and his involvement in Project Babylon, Saddam Hussein's plan to build a supergun with a range of over 500 miles
 Ed Wood (1994) – based on the story of film director Edward D. Wood Jr., starring Johnny Depp as Ed Wood
 Farinelli (1994) – biographical drama film centering on the life and career of the 18th-century Italian opera singer Carlo Broschi, known as Farinelli, considered the greatest castrato singer of all time; as well as his relationship with his brother, composer Riccardo Broschi
 The Fatima Buen Story (1994) – Philippine biographical crime drama film based on Fatima Buen, a complex woman jailed for illegal recruitment
 For the Love of Aaron (1994) – Canadian television film, based on the true story of Margaret Gibson, a noted Canadian writer who suffered from bipolar disorder, the film dramatizes her custody battle for her son Aaron after her divorce
 For the Love of Nancy (1994) – made-for-television drama film based on Nancy Walsh, a graduating senior who suffers from anorexia nervosa
 Getting Gotti (1994) – TV film centering on a Brooklyn Assistant District Attorney named Diane Giacalone, and her attempts to build a Racketeer Influenced and Corrupt Organizations Act (RICO) case against John Gotti and the Gambino crime family
 The Glass Shield (1994) – crime drama film based on a true story about the first black cop to be assigned to a California sheriff's department
 Heavenly Creatures (1994) – based on the true story of Juliet Hulme and Pauline Parker, principals in the 1954 Parker–Hulme murder case in New Zealand
 I Can't Sleep (French: J'ai pas sommeil) (1994) – French drama film loosely inspired by the murders committed by Thierry Paulin
 It Could Happen to You (1994) – romantic comedy-drama film based on the true story of a New York City police officer who wins the lottery and splits his winnings with a waitress
 Kabloonak (1994) – Canadian drama film about the making of Nanook of the North, a 1922 film about an Inuk called Nanook and his family in the Canadian Arctic
 La Reine Margot ( Queen Margot) (1994) – French period film based on Alexandre Dumas' novel about Catholics and Protestant Huguenots fighting over political control of France
 Ladybird, Ladybird (1994) – British drama film about a British woman's dispute with Social Services over the care and custody of her four children
 Lakota Woman: Siege at Wounded Knee (1994) – based on Mary Crow Dog's autobiography Lakota Woman, wherein she accounts her troubled youth, involvement with the American Indian Movement, and relationship with Lakota medicine man and activist Leonard Crow Dog
 The Madness of King George (1994) – the true story of King George III's deteriorating mental health, which stemmed from porphyria; based on the play The Madness of George III
 Menendez: A Killing in Beverly Hills (1994) – television film about Lyle and Erik Menendez, who murdered their parents in 1989
 Mrs. Parker and the Vicious Circle (1994) – about writer Dorothy Parker and the members of the Algonquin Round Table, a group of writers, actors and critics who met almost daily from 1919 to 1929 at Manhattan's Algonquin Hotel
 Octobre (1994) – Quebec film telling a fictionalized version of the October Crisis from the point of view of the Chénier Cell, the FLQ terrorist cell who in 1970 kidnapped and murdered Quebec minister and Deputy Premier Pierre Laporte
 One of Her Own (1994) – television film based on a true story of a rookie policewoman who was raped by a fellow officer
 Princess Caraboo (1994) – based on the story of Mary Baker (née Willcocks: b. 11 November 1792) who was a noted imposter who fooled an entire British town for months that she was a princess from a far off kingdom.
 The Quality of Mercy (German: Hasenjagd – Vor lauter Feigheit gibt es kein Erbarmen) (1994) – Austrian film, a dramatization of the events surrounding the Mühlviertler Hasenjagd, a Nazi war crime that took place near Linz, in the Mühlviertel region of Upper Austria, just before the end of the Second World War
 Quiz Show (1994) – adapted from a book by Richard N. Goodwin about the real-life American television quiz show scandals of the 1950s
 Roswell (1994) – television film based on a supposedly true story about the Roswell UFO incident, the supposed U.S. military capture of a flying saucer and its alien crew following a crash near the town of Roswell, New Mexico, in July 1947
 Sister My Sister (1994) – British film based on a true incident in Le Mans, France in 1933 called the Papin murder case, where two sisters brutally murdered their employer and her daughter
 Snowbound: The Jim and Jennifer Stolpa Story (1994) – television film based on a true story, Jim and Jennifer Stolpa and their infant son Clayton are 500 miles from their home in Castro Valley, California, when they lose their way and are stranded in an endless wilderness of deep snow in northern Nevada, east of Cedarville, California
 Tarzan of Manisa (Turkish: Manisa Tarzanı) (1994) – Turkish biographical drama film about Ahmet bin Carlak, also known as the "Tarzan of Manisa" 1899–1963
 Terror in the Night (1994) – made-for-television thriller film based on the story of Tom Cross and his girlfriend, Robin Andrews, who are awakened by "police officer" Lonnie Carter, a psychotic brutal murderer on-the-loose with his girlfriend Tina and her two children, who claims that he is taking them to police headquarters, but instead kidnaps and terrorizes them
 Tom & Viv (1994) – based on the turbulent relationship between T.S. Eliot and his first wife, Vivienne Haigh-Wood Eliot
 Tonya and Nancy: The Inside Story (1994) – made-for-television biographical satirical-drama film focusing on the 1994 Cobo Arena attack on Nancy Kerrigan and the extensive media coverage surrounding the infamous incident
 Ultimate Betrayal (1994) – made-for-television drama film based on a true story about two sisters who sue their father for incest and child abuse
 White Mile (1994) – made-for-television thriller-drama film loosely based on a rafting accident, on August 1, 1987, on the White Mile rapids in the Bidwell Canyon section of the Chilko River, in the Central Interior of British Columbia, Canada
 Wyatt Earp (1994) – biographical Western film about Old West lawman and gambler Wyatt Earp (1848–1929)

1995 
 A Single Spark (Korean: Jeon tae-il) (1995) – South Korean biographical drama film about Jeon Tae-il, a worker who protested labor conditions through self-immolation
 Across the Sea of Time (1995) – IMAX 3D adventure film about a young Russian boy who travels to the United States in search of his ancestor's family
 The Affair (1995) – romantic drama television film about an African-American soldier in the United States Army who is deployed to England during World War II and has an affair with a British officer's wife
 Apollo 13 (1995) – the story of the Apollo 13 lunar mission, based on the book Lost Moon by Apollo 13 astronaut Jim Lovell and Jeffrey Kluger
 The Bait (French:  L'appât) (1995) – French film about two boys and a girl who commit a murder, with the girl acting as the "bait", the film is based on the 1990 book of the same name by Morgan Sportès, which is in turn based on the "Valérie Subra affair", a true event that happened in 1984
 Balto (1995) – British-American live-action/animated adventure film loosely based on a true story about the dog of the same name who helped save children infected with diphtheria in the 1925 serum run to Nome
 The Basketball Diaries (1995) – based on the autobiographical book of the same name by author and musician Jim Carroll, an edited collection of diaries he kept between the ages of 12 and 16, it tells the story of Carroll's teenage years as a promising high school basketball player and writer who develops an addiction to heroin
 Bombay (1995) – Indian Tamil bilingual film centered on the 1993 Bombay riots
 Braveheart (1995) – historical drama war film based on the story of William Wallace of Scotland, a 13th-century Scottish warrior who led the Scots in the First War of Scottish Independence against King Edward I of England
 Butterbox Babies (1995) – adapted from the book Butterbox Babies by Bette L. Cahill, based on the true story of the Ideal Maternity Home, a home for unwed pregnant mothers, during the Great Depression and Second World War. The home made millions from the illegal adoption of illegitimate babies during the 1930s and 1940s
 Cafe Society (1995) – mystery film about New York society playboy Mickey Jelke who inherits a large sum of money  and soon becomes embroiled in shadowy web of political exploitation and scandal in 1952
 Carrington (1995) – chronicles the relationship between English painter Dora Carrington and writer Lytton Strachey
 Casino (1995) – epic crime film telling the story of the last mafia-run casino in Las Vegas, the fictional Tangiers, based on Frank Rosenthal, who ran the Stardust, Fremont, and Hacienda casinos in Las Vegas for the Chicago Outfit from the 1970s until the early 1980s
 Choices of the Heart: The Margaret Sanger Story (1995) – television film about the controversial nurse Margaret Sanger who campaigned in the earlier decades of the 20th century in the United States for women's birth control
 Citizen X (1995) – television film based on the investigation into murders committed by Soviet serial killer Andrei Chikatilo
 Dangerous Minds (1995) – drama film  based on the story of teacher LouAnne Johnson who takes on the challenge of an unruly class and wins them over
 Dead Man Walking (1995) – crime drama film adapted from the 1993 non-fiction book of the same name, Sister Helen Prejean establishes a special relationship with Matthew Poncelet, a character based on convicted murderers Elmo Patrick Sonnier and Robert Lee Willie
 Deathmaker (German: Der Totmacher) (1995) – German film based on the transcripts of the interrogation of the notorious serial killer Fritz Haarmann
 Dead Presidents (1995) – crime thriller film about the life of Anthony Curtis, focusing on his teenage years as a high school graduate and his experiences during the Vietnam War, based partly on the real-life experiences of Haywood T. Kirkland (a.k.a. Ari S. Merretazon)
 Deadly Whispers (1995) – television film depicting a father with dissociative identity disorder who murders his daughter. Based on Ted Schwarz's book of the same name, it is a fictionalized account of the  murder of Kathy Bonney in 1987
 Escape from Terror: The Teresa Stamper Story (1995) – crime drama television film based on a true story from Unsolved Mysteries
 Eskapo (1995) – Filipino historical thriller film about Eugenio "Geny" López Jr. and Sergio "Serge" Osmeña III who are separately arrested based on false accusations of attempts to assassinate President Ferdinand Marcos in the 1970s
 Falling from the Sky: Flight 174 (1995) – made-for-television film based on the real-life events of Air Canada Flight 143, nicknamed the "Gimli Glider"
 Heat (1995) – loosely based on Chicago police officer Chuck Adamson's pursuit of career criminal Neil McCauley in the 1960s
 If Someone Had Known (1995) – crime drama television film based on a young wife and mother who is abused by her husband 
 Indictment: The McMartin Trial (1995) – based on a real-life court case, the film finds members of the McMartin family on trial for alleged sexual molestation and abuse of children at their well-regarded preschool
 The Infiltrator (1995) – thriller film based on the book In Hitler's Shadow: An Israeli's Journey Inside Germany's Neo-Nazi Movement by Yaron Svoray and Nick Taylor about an Israeli freelance journalist who travels to Germany in the early 1990s and uncovers a pervasive underground Neo-Nazi faction with the intent to bring Nazism back to the forefront in Germany
 Killer: A Journal of Murder (1995) –  drama film about the 1920s serial killer Carl Panzram, who befriended prison guard Henry Lesser
 Les Milles (1995) – French drama film about Germans, Jews, Communists or opponents of Nazism who had taken refuge in France, who were interned in the Camp des Milles, near Aix-en-Provence and get on a train to evacuate to Bayonne in May 1940
 Losing Isaiah (1995) – drama film based on the novel of the same name by Seth Margolis, about the biological and adoptive mothers of a young boy who are involved in a bitter, controversial custody battle
 Murder in the First (1995) –  legal drama film about petty criminal Henri Young, who is put on trial for murder in the first degree
 Nixon (1995) – the story of American President Richard Nixon
 Operation Dumbo Drop (1995) – comedy film based on a true story by United States Army Major Jim Morris, about Green Berets during the Vietnam War in 1968 who attempt to transport an elephant through jungle terrain to a local South Vietnamese village, which in turn helps American forces monitor Viet Cong activity
 Pocahontas (1995) – highly fictionalized film about the settlement of Jamestown, Virginia, the first feature-length animated film by Disney to be based on historical events
 Policemen (Italian: Poliziotti) (1995) –  Italian crime-drama film based on a policeman, Vincenzo Rizzi, who had committed suicide while in jail
 Ravan Raaj: A True Story (1995) – Hindi film based on a doctor's story, centered on kidney smugglers and a serial killer
 Red Cherry (Chinese: Hong ying tao) (1995) – Chinese film based on the true story of Chuchu, a 13-year-old Chinese girl, and Luo Xiaoman, a 12-year-old Chinese boy, who were sent to Moscow, Russia in the 1940s and enrolled into an international boarding school
 Savate (1995) – martial arts Western film promoted as the allegedly true story of the world's first kickboxer
 She Fought Alone (1995) – television film about a girl in a small rural town who gets raped by a football player
 Stonewall (1995) – British-American historical comedy drama film inspired by the memoir of the same title by gay historian Martin Duberman, Stonewall a fictionalized account of the weeks leading up to the Stonewall riots, a seminal event in the modern American gay rights movement
 Tyson (1995) – television film based on the life of American heavyweight boxer Mike Tyson
 Who Killed Pasolini? (Italian: Pasolini, un delitto italiano) (1995) – Italian crime-drama film depicting the trial against Pino Pelosi, who was charged with the murder of artist and filmmaker Pier Paolo Pasolini
 Wild Bill (1995) – Western film about the last days of legendary lawman Wild Bill Hickok
 The Young Poisoner's Handbook (1995) – British-German-French dark comedy based on the life of Graham Young, more commonly known as "The Teacup Murderer" of the 1970s

1996 
 After Jimmy (1996) – made-for-television drama film based on a teenage boy's suicide
 Apollo 11 (1996) – television film about the Apollo 11 spaceflight
 Basquiat (1996) – biographical drama film based on the life of American postmodernist/neo expressionist artist Jean-Michel Basquiat
 Bastard Out of Carolina (1996) – based on real-life events of child abuse from the semi-autobiographical book of the same title by Dorothy Allison
 Born Free: A New Adventure (1996) – made-for-television adventure film based on the real life of the lioness Elsa
 Color of a Brisk and Leaping Day (1996) – drama film about a Chinese-American's attempt at saving a railroad in post-World War II California
 Crime of the Century (1996) – television film, a dramatization of the Lindbergh kidnapping of 1932 
 The Crucible (1996) – drama based on the Salem witch trials between 1692 and 1693, written by Arthur Miller and based on his play of the same name
 Dead Heart (1996) – Australian film based on the true story of an aboriginal who killed someone in the 1930s for traditional reasons
 Deadly Voyage (1996) – television film about Kingsley Ofosu, the sole survivor of a group of nine African stowaways murdered on the cargo ship MC Ruby in 1992
 Deep Crimson (Spanish: Profundo Carmesí) (1996) – Mexican crime film, a dramatization of the story of "Lonely Hearts Killers", Raymond Fernandez and Martha Beck, who committed a string of murders of women in the 1940s
 The Dentist (1996) – horror film based on real-life dentist/serial killer Nick Rex
 Devil's Island (Icelandic: Djöflaeyjan) (1996) – Icelandic dark comedy film depicting a group of otherwise homeless families living in barracks abandoned by the US Air Force after the Second World War
 The Disappearance of Garcia Lorca (1996) – Spanish-American drama-biographical film based on a book by Ian Gibson about the life and murder of Spanish poet Federico García Lorca
 Entertaining Angels: The Dorothy Day Story (1996) – independent film about the life of Dorothy Day, the journalist turned social activist and founder of the Catholic Worker newspaper
 Fly Away Home (1996) – adapted from the book by Bill Lishman, dramatizing the actual experiences of Bill Lishman who in 1986 started training geese to follow his ultralight and succeeded in leading their migration in 1993
 For My Daughter's Honor (1996) – made-for-television drama film about a popular coach, Lynn Stroud (named Pete Nash in the film), who is accused of having a sexual relation with a 14 year old, one of his school's pupils
 Forgotten Sins (1996) – made-for-television drama film based on Lawrence Wright's New Yorker articles and his book Remembering Satan, which was in turn based on the actual case of Paul Ingram
 Frozen (Chinese: Jidu hanleng) (1996) – Chinese film supposedly based on a true story, about young performance artist, Qi Lei, who attempts to create a masterpiece centered on the theme of death. After two "acts" where he simulates death, he decides that his final act will be a true suicide through hypothermia
 The Ghost and the Darkness (1996) – fictionalized account about two lions that attacked and killed workers in Tsavo, Kenya during the building of the African Uganda-Mombasa Railway in 1898, killing 130 people over a nine-month period
 Ghosts of Mississippi (1996) – based on the 1994 third retrial of Byron De La Beckwith, white supremacist accused of the 1963 assassination of civil rights activist Medgar Evers
 Giant Mine (1996) – Canadian television film, which dramatizes the events of the 1992 Giant Mine labour dispute and the subsequent bomb explosion which killed nine replacement workers
 Gone in the Night (1996) – television film about the Jaclyn Dowaliby murder case
 Hillsborough (1996) – television film set between 1989 and 1991, a dramatization of the Hillsborough disaster, which saw 96 football supporters lose their lives at Hillsborough in Sheffield
 Hostile Advances: The Kerry Ellison Story (1996) – made-for-television drama film based on Ellison v. Brady, a landmark sexual harassment case
 I Shot Andy Warhol (1996) – based on the life of Valerie Solanas and her relationship with Andy Warhol
 In Cold Blood (1996) – TV miniseries based on Truman Capote's true crime book of the same name that follows a pair of ex-cons who murdered a respected Midwestern rancher and his family
 Intimate Relations (1996) – Canadian-British film based on the true story of Albert Goozee, who was put on trial in 1956 in England after his 53-year-old landlady, Mrs. Lydia Leakey, and her 14-year-old daughter, Norma, were found murdered
 It's My Party (1996) – drama film based on the true events of the death of Harry Stein, accomplished architect and designer, who was actually director Randal Kleiser's ex-lover. Stein's actual farewell party was held in 1992
 Jerusalem (1996) – Swedish/Danish/Norwegian production based on the two-part novel Jerusalem by Selma Lagerlöf, inspired by real events from the end of the 19th century, a time when many people left Europe to find a better life abroad
 Justice for Annie: A Moment of Truth Movie (1996) – American/Canadian made-for-television drama film based on the case of Deana Hubbard Wild (named Annie Mills Carman in the film), who was pushed to her death from a cliff for insurance money
 The Late Shift (1996) – television film based on the book of the same name by The New York Times media reporter Bill Carter, about the rivalry between David Letterman and Jay Leno
 Michael Collins (1996) – based on the life of IRA leader Michael Collins
 Mr. and Mrs. Loving (1996) – television film based on a true story, but with fictionalized parts, about the effects of interracial marriage in the 1960s
 No One Would Tell (1996) – teen crime drama television film based on the true story of Jamie Fuller, a 16-year-old high school student who murdered his 14-year-old girlfriend, Amy Carnevale, on August 23, 1991, in Beverly, Massachusetts
 Normal Life (1996) – crime drama film based on the real lives of husband-and-wife bank robbers, Jeffrey and Jill Erickson
 The One That Got Away (1996) – South African television film based on the book of the same name by Chris Ryan telling the true story of a Special Air Service patrol during the Gulf War in 1991
 The People vs. Larry Flynt (1996) – biographical drama film chronicling the rise of pornographer Larry Flynt and his subsequent clash with religious institutions and the law
 Public Enemies (1996) – centering on the 1930s figure Ma Barker and her criminal sons
 Race the Sun (1996) – comedy drama film loosely based on the true story of the Konawaena High School Solar Car Team, which finished 18th in the 1990 World Solar Challenge and first place among high school entries
 Rowing Through (1996) – Canadian/Japanese co-produced drama film based on David Halberstam's book The Amateurs, the film centers on American sculler Tiff Wood as he tries to qualify for the 1984 Summer Olympics
 Seduced by Madness: The Diane Borchardt Story (1996) – television film based roughly on real-life events, the film recounts the story of  Wisconsin teacher Diane Borchardt, who hired teen students first to spy on her cheating husband and later to kill him
 The Siege at Ruby Ridge (1996) – drama television film about the confrontation between the family of Randy Weaver and the US federal government at Ruby Ridge in 1992
 Some Mother's Son (1996) – Irish/American film based on the true story of the 1981 hunger strike in the Maze Prison, in Northern Ireland
 To Brave Alaska (1996) – made-for-TV adventure film about a young couple who attempt to survive in the rough Alaskan wilderness
 Twisted Desire (1996) – drama/thriller film based on the 1990 murders of the parents of 14-year-old Jessica Wiseman
 Unabomber: The True Story (1996) – made-for-television biographical film about Ted Kaczynski, who is also known as the Unabomber
 Unforgivable (1996) – made-for-television drama film about Paul Hegstrom, a ferociously violent man who is forced to join a group therapy program
 White Squall (1996) – based on the fate of the brigantine Albatross, which sank May 2, 1961, allegedly because of a white squall
 The Whole Wide World (1996) – biographical drama film about Robert E. Howard, the creator of Conan the Barbarian

1997 
 ...First Do No Harm (1997) – made-for-television drama film about a boy whose severe epilepsy, unresponsive to medications with terrible side effects, is controlled by the ketogenic diet. Aspects of the story mirror director Jim Abrahams' own experience with his son Charlie
 Amistad (1997) – based on the true story of a slave mutiny that took place aboard the ship La Amistad in 1839, and the legal battle that followed
 An Eyewitness Account (Italian: Testimone a rischio) (1997) – Italian thriller-drama film based on real life events of Sicilian Mafia hit eyewitness Piero Nava
 Anastasia (1997) – animated musical drama film loosely based on the story of the Grand Duchess Anastasia Nikolaevna of Russia
 Any Mother's Son (1997) – television drama film based on the true story of US Navy Petty Officer Allen Schindler, who is murdered by two of his fellow seamen while on shore leave from his post in Japan
 The Arrow (1997) – four-hour television miniseries about Crawford Gordon, an experienced wartime production leader after World War II and president of Avro Canada during its attempt to produce the Avro Arrow supersonic jet interceptor aircraft
 Boogie Nights (1997) – loosely based on the life of porn star John Holmes
 Border (1997) – Indian war film based on the Indo-Pakistan War of 1971
 Buddy (1997) – family comedy film based on the life of a gorilla called Massa with elements of Mrs. Gertrude "Trudy" Lintz's other gorilla Gargantua (who was called "Buddy" at the time)
 Comedian Harmonists (1997) – German film about the popular German vocal group the Comedian Harmonists of the 1920s and 1930s
 Crowned and Dangerous (1997) – made-for-TV film about the murder of a beauty queen, and the investigation that revealed the suspects to be a former lover, a rival contestant, and a stage mother
 David (1997) – television film about King David, as told in the biblical story
 Daughters (a.k.a. Our Mother's Murder) (1997) – made-for-TV drama film about the murder of publishing heiress Anne Scripps
 Detention: The Siege at Johnson High (1997) – made-for-television thriller drama film based on the 1992 Lindhurst High School shooting and siege that resulted in the death of four people
 The Disappearance of Garcia Lorca (1997) – Spanish-American biographical drama film based on a book by Ian Gibson about the life and murder of Spanish poet Federico García Lorca
 Donnie Brasco (1997) – loosely based on Joseph D. Pistone, the FBI agent who successfully infiltrated the Bonanno crime family in New York City during the 1970s
 FairyTale: A True Story (1997) – French-American fantasy drama film loosely based on the story of the Cottingley Fairies in the year 1917 in England, about two children who take a photograph soon believed to be the first scientific evidence of the existence of fairies
 Fever Pitch (1997) – British film loosely based on Nick Hornby's best-selling memoir, Fever Pitch: A Fan's Life (1992)
 First Time Felon (1997) – based on the true story of young Chicago drug dealer Greg Yance
 For All - O Trampolim da Vitória ( For All: Springboard to Victory) (1997) – Brazilian comedy drama about a US established military base in Natal, Brazil during World War II
 Four Days in September (Portuguese: O Que É Isso, Companheiro?) (1997) – Brazilian thriller film that tells the true story of the abduction of American ambassador Charles Burke Elbrick in 1969 by the MR-8 group, adapted from the book by Fernando Gabeira
 Gaston's War (1997) – Belgian drama film based on a novel by Allan Mayer, the film is set many decades after the Second World War, and tells the story of a Belgian resistance fighter, Gaston Vandermeerssche, who tries to discover who betrayed them to the Nazis
 Hav Plenty (1997) – romantic comedy film based on an eventful weekend in the life of Lee Plenty, based on the true story of Christopher Scott Cherot's unrequited romance with Def Jam A&R executive Drew Dixon
 Hoodlum (1997) – crime drama film, a fictionalized account of the gang war between the Italian/Jewish mafia alliance and the black gangsters of Harlem that took place in the late 1920s and early 1930s. The film concentrated on Ellsworth "Bumpy" Johnson, Dutch Schultz, and Charles "Lucky" Luciano
 Iruvar (1997) – Indian Tamil political drama based on the life of Indian actor, director, producer and politician M. G. Ramachandran and Indian politician M. Karunanidhi
 Kundun (1997) – based on the life of the Dalai Lama, the exiled political and spiritual leader of Tibet
 Love's Deadly Triangle: The Texas Cadet Murder (1997) – made-for-television drama film based on the real life murder of Adrianne Jones by Diane Zamora in Texas
 Midnight in the Garden of Good and Evil (1997) – mystery thriller film based on John Berendt's 1994 book of the same name and follows the story of an antiques dealer on trial for the murder of a male prostitute, part fact and part fiction
 Mrs. Brown (1997) – based on the relationship between Queen Victoria and Scottish servant John Brown following the death of Prince Albert
 Nattbuss 807 ( Night Bus 807) (1997) – Swedish thriller film based on the real murder of a young skinhead in 1992
 No Child of Mine (1997) – British drama-television film about the true case of a girl named Kerry who was sexually abused throughout her childhood
 Paradise Road (1997) – war film about a group of English, American, Australian, and Dutch women imprisoned by the Japanese in Sumatra during World War II
 Path to Paradise: The Untold Story of the World Trade Center Bombing (1997) – television film depicting the events surrounding the 1993 World Trade Center bombing
 The Place of the Dead (1997) – British television film about a British Army expedition in Malaysia that made headlines in 1994 when it went badly wrong
 Prefontaine (1997) – based on the life of Olympic hopeful Steve Prefontaine, a middle and long-distance runner who competed in the 1972 Summer Olympics and died at age 24 in a car accident
 Prison of Secrets (1997) – television film based on the true story of a female prison inmate who fights for women's rights while still in jail
 Private Parts (1997) – based on eccentric radio DJ Howard Stern's 1993 autobiography of the same name
 Rosewood (1997) – dramatization of a 1923 racist lynch mob attack on an African American community
 The Sarah Balabagan Story (1997) – Filipino biopic revolving around the case of OFW, Sarah Balabagan who was sentenced to death in the United Arab Emirates
 Selena (1997) – based on the life of Mexican-American singer Selena Quintanilla Perez
 Seven Years in Tibet (1997) – based on the autobiographical travel book written by Austrian mountaineer Heinrich Harrer, based on his real life experiences in Tibet between 1944 and 1951 during World War II and the interim period before the Communist Chinese People's Liberation Army resumed control of Tibet in 1950
 Shanghai 1937 (1997) – German two-part miniseries about westerners staying at a popular hotel in Shanghai during the Japanese invasion of China also known as the Second Sino-Japanese War begins in 1937
 Sleeping with the Devil (1997) – television film based upon the novel of the same name by Suzanne Finstad, about a nurse who gets in a romantic relationship with a billionaire
 The Sleepwalker Killing (1997) – TV movie based on a popular real-life case from the Unsolved Mysteries television series
 Stolen Women, Captured Hearts (1997) – made-for-television film loosely based on Anna Morgan, a woman living on the plains of Kansas in 1868 who is kidnapped by a band of Lakota Indians
 Subway Stories (1997) – television film, a dramatization of ten stories of New York City subway riders
 Titanic (1997) – epic romance disaster film incorporating both historical and fictionalized aspects, it is based on accounts of the sinking of the RMS Titanic
 Vasiliki (1997) – Greek film about Vasiliki, the wife of a Greek communist guerrilla during the Greek Civil War
 Wild America (1997) – adventure comedy film based on the life of wildlife documentarian Marty Stouffer
 Wilde (1997) – British biographical film based on events in the life of Irish writer Oscar Wilde

1998 
 23 (1998) – German drama thriller film about a young hacker who died on 23 May 1989, a presumed suicide
 A Bright Shining Lie (1998) – made-for-television war drama film based on Neil Sheehan's book of the same name and the true story of John Paul Vann's experience in the Vietnam War
 A Civil Action (1998) – based on the book of the same name by Jonathan Harr, telling the true story of environmental pollution that took place in Woburn, Massachusetts, in the 1980s
 At the End of the Day: The Sue Rodriguez Story (1998) – Canadian television film about the life of Canadian right to die advocate Sue Rodriguez
 The Apple (Persian: Sib) (1998) – Iranian film based on the true story of two daughters who are locked up by their parents for eleven years, when their neighbors call social workers to investigate the situation, the girls are released
 The Brylcreem Boys (1998) – British romantic comedy film set in Ireland against the extraordinary neutrality arrangements in Ireland during World War II
 Daun di Atas Bantal ( Leaf on a Pillow) (1998) – Indonesian film based on true stories of the lives of three street boys in Yogyakarta in Java, Indonesia
 Elizabeth (1998) – centered on the early years of the reign of Elizabeth I of England and her difficult task of learning what is necessary to be a monarch
 Escape: Human Cargo (1998) – action drama film based on the true story of an American businessman who loses his passport and exit visa in Saudi Arabia
 Fifteen and Pregnant (1998) – based on the true story of Tina, a 15-year-old pregnant girl
 Forever Love (1998) – television film partially based on Anne Shapiro's awakening after being in a coma for 20 years
 Gia (1998) – based on the life of Gia Carangi, a top American fashion model during the late 1970s and early 1980s
 Glory & Honor (1998) – television film based on the true story of Robert Peary and Matthew Henson's 1909 journey to the Geographic North Pole, and their nearly 20-year history of exploring the Arctic together
 Gods and Monsters (1998) – depiction of the last days of British film director James Whale
 Lautrec (1998) – French biographical film about the painter Henri de Toulouse-Lautrec
 The Long Island Incident (1998) – made-for-television drama film based on the 1993 Long Island Rail Road shooting
 Love Is the Devil: Study for a Portrait of Francis Bacon (1998) – British made-for-television film, a fictional biography of  painter Francis Bacon
 Miracle at Midnight (1998) – TV movie based on the rescue of the Danish Jews in Denmark during the Holocaust
 The Newton Boys (1998) – comedy drama film based on the true story of the Newton Gang, a family of bank robbers from Uvalde, Texas
 Nicholas' Gift (1998) – made-for-television drama film about an American couple on vacation in Italy in 1994 when their two children are attacked and shot by highway bandits
 Of Freaks and Men (Russian: Pro urodov i lyudey) (1998) – Russian film centered on two families and their decline at the hands of one man, Johann, and his pornographic endeavours
 Patch Adams (1998) – the story of the medical doctor, clown, performer, and social activist Patch Adams
 The Pentagon Wars (1998) – military comedy film based on the book The Pentagon Wars: Reformers Challenge the Old Guard by Colonel James G. Burton, United States Air Force
 Psycho (1998) – inspired by the crimes of the real-life serial killer, Ed Gein; remake of Alfred Hitchcock's Psycho (1960)
 Ruby Bridges (1998) – television film based on the true story of Ruby Bridges, one of the first black students to attend integrated schools in New Orleans, Louisiana, in 1960
 Savior (1998) – war film about a U.S. mercenary escorting a Bosnian Serb woman and her newborn child to a United Nations safe zone during the Bosnian War.
 Saving Private Ryan (1998) – inspired by the story of the Niland Brothers during World War II
 Shot Through the Heart (1998) – television film which covers the Siege of Sarajevo during the Bosnian War, the film is based on a true story and an article called Anti-Sniper by John Falk
 The Temptations (1998) – two-part miniseries based upon the history of one of Motown's longest-lived acts, American vocal group The Temptations
 The Versace Murder (1998) – docu-drama focusing on the murder of fashion designer Gianni Versace by alleged serial killer Andrew Cunanan
 Why Do Fools Fall in Love (1998) – biographical drama film about R&B/Rock and roll singer Frankie Lymon, lead singer of the pioneering rock and roll group Frankie Lymon & the Teenagers for one year
 Windhorse (1998) – based on the lives of three young Tibetans who struggle for freedom against the Chinese communist regime
 Without Limits (1998) – biographical film about the relationship between record-breaking distance runner Steve Prefontaine and his coach Bill Bowerman, who later co-founded Nike, Inc.
 Witness to the Mob (1998) – made-for-TV film that follows the rise of Sammy Gravano in ranks in the Gambino crime family, one of the "Five Families" of the New York Cosa Nostra

1999 
 Aimée & Jaguar (1999) – German drama film set in Berlin during World War II, based on Erica Fischer's book chronicling the actual lives of Lilly Wust and Felice Schragenheim during that time
 All the King's Men (1999) – British World War I television drama about the mystery of Sandringham Company, which disappeared in action at Gallipoli in 1915
 Angela's Ashes (1999) – Irish-American drama based on the memoir of the same title by Frank McCourt, telling the story of McCourt and his childhood after he and his family are forced to move from America back to Ireland because of financial difficulties and family problems caused by his father's alcoholism
 Anna and the King (1999) – the story of Anglo-Indian travel writer, educator and social activist Anna Leonowens and her experiences in Siam (Thailand)
 At First Sight (1999) – romantic drama film based on the essay "To See and Not See" in neurologist Oliver Sacks' 1995 book An Anthropologist on Mars and inspired by the true life story of Shirl Jennings
 Bhopal Express (1999) – Indian drama film set against the gas tragedy in Bhopal, India, in 1984
 The Blonde Bombshell (1999) – British two-part mini-series based on the life and death of actress Diana Dors
 Boys Don't Cry (1999) – the story of hate crime victim Brandon Teena
 Cradle Will Rock (1999) – historical drama film that fictionalizes the true events that surrounded the development of the 1937 musical The Cradle Will Rock by Marc Blitzstein
 The Cup (Tibetan: Phörpa) (1999) – Bhutanese Tibetan-language film about two young football-crazed Tibetan refugee novice monks in a remote Himalayan monastery in India who desperately try to obtain a television for the monastery to watch the 1998 World Cup final
 The Debt (Polish: Dług) (1999) – Polish film based on two entrepreneurs who become tangled in the web of a Russian thug in Warsaw, Poland in the early 1990s
 Dockers (1999) – British television drama about the struggles of a small group of Liverpool dockers who were sacked and subsequently spent nearly 2 and a half years picketing during the Liverpool Dockers' Strike of 1995 to 1998
 Excellent Cadavers (Italian: I giudici) (1999) – Italian/American television film based on the book with the same name by Alexander Stille and tells the real life events of judge Giovanni Falcone
 Girl, Interrupted (1999) – based on author Susanna Kaysen's memoir of the same name, chronicling her 18-month stay at a mental institution
 Grey Owl (1999) – British/Canadian biopic about British schoolboy turned Native American trapper "Grey Owl", Archibald Belaney (1888–1938)
 The Hunley (1999) – television film about the Confederate submarine H. L. Hunley, the first combat submarine to sink a warship
 The Hurricane (1999) – based on the imprisonment of middleweight boxer Rubin "Hurricane" Carter
 In a Class of His Own (1999) – made-for-television drama film about the true story of a high school janitor who never graduated high school and now must get his GED or lose his job
 In Too Deep (1999) – crime thriller film loosely based on a book about the takedown of a Boston gang lord, aided by an undercover cop
 Inherit the Wind (1999) – made-for-television film adaptation of the 1955 play of the same name which originally aired on Showtime. The original play was written as a parable which fictionalized the 1925 Scopes "Monkey" Trial as a means of discussing the 1950s McCarthy trials
 The Insider (1999) – based on the experiences of Dr. Jeffrey Wigand, a tobacco industry whistleblower
 Jesus (1999) – Italian/American biblical historical drama television film that retells the historical events of Jesus Christ
 Joan of Arc (1999) – Canadian miniseries based on the story of Joan of Arc, a young girl who believed she was God's messenger
 Man on the Moon (1999) – biopic about the life of late comedian Andy Kaufman
 The Messenger: The Story of Joan of Arc (1999) – based on the story of Joan of Arc, a young girl who believed she was God's messenger
 Molokai: The Story of Father Damien (1999) – Belgian biographical film of Father Damien, a Belgian priest working at the Kalaupapa Leprosy Settlement on the Hawaiian island of Molokai
 The Murder of Stephen Lawrence (1999) – British television true crime drama film based on the murder committed on 22 April 1993, and follows Stephen's parents' Doreen and Neville's quest for justice as a gang of racists are tried for their son's murder
 Music of the Heart (1999) – dramatization of the true story of Roberta Guaspari, who co-founded the Opus 118 Harlem School of Music and fought for music education funding in New York City public schools
 Mutiny (1999) – television drama film based on the story of the Port Chicago disaster during World War II where 50 African-American sailors were accused of mutiny because they declined to continue loading munitions after an explosion caused by failures in training and management
 My Life So Far (1999) – British/American film about a year in the life of a ten-year-old Scottish boy, set in 1927 and based on the memoirs of Denis Forman, a British television executive
 Not One Less (Mandarin: Yi ge dou bu neng shao) (1999) – Chinese drama film adapted from Shi Xiangsheng's 1997 story A Sun in the Sky, set in the People's Republic of China during the 1990s, the film centers on a 13-year-old substitute teacher, Wei Minzhi, in the Chinese countryside
 October Sky (1999) – biographical film adapted from the memoir Rocket Boys by Homer Hickam, a coal miner's son who was inspired by the launch of Sputnik 1 to take up rocketry against his father's wishes, and eventually became a NASA engineer
 One Man's Hero (1999) – historical war drama film about the true story of John Riley and the Saint Patrick's Battalion, a group of Irish Catholic immigrants who desert from the mostly Protestant U.S. Army to the mostly Catholic Mexican side during the Mexican–American War of 1846 to 1848
 Pirates of Silicon Valley (1999) – based on the story of Steve Jobs (Apple Computer) and Bill Gates (Microsoft) and their rivalry on the development of the personal computer
 The Return of Alex Kelly (a.k.a. The Alex Kelly Story) (1999) – Canadian film based on the life of convicted rapist Alex Kelly
 RKO 281 (1999) – historical drama film about the story of the making of Citizen Kane (1941)
 Rogue Trader (1999) – British biographical drama centering around the life of former derivatives broker Nick Leeson and the 1995 collapse of Barings Bank
 The Straight Story (1999) – based on the story of Alvin Straight's journey across Iowa and Wisconsin on a lawnmower
 Strange Justice (1999) – television film based on events regarding the sexual harassment accusation brought by Anita Hill during the Senate confirmation hearings of Clarence Thomas for the United States Supreme Court during the George H. W. Bush presidential administration
 Summer of Sam (1999) – crime thriller film about the 1977 David Berkowitz ("Son of Sam") serial murders and their effect on a group of fictional residents of an Italian-American neighborhood in The Bronx in the late 1970s
 Switched at Birth (1999) – made-for-television drama film about two baby boys born more or less at the same time, who were switched soon after they were born
 Topsy-Turvy (1999) – musical drama concerning the period in 1884–1885 leading up to the premiere of Gilbert and Sullivan's The Mikado, focusing on the creative conflict between playwright and composer, and the decision by the two men to continue their partnership
 Tuesdays with Morrie (1999) – television film based on the memoir of the same title
 Ultimate Deception (a.k.a. Ultimate Betrayal) (1999) – made-for-television drama film about a man who has had a vasectomy and kills a young mother and steals her 3 month old baby, to please his married wife who yearns to raise a family
 The Winslow Boy (1999) – British/American period drama film set in London before World War I, it depicts a family defending the honour of its young son at all cost, based on Terence Rattigan's 1946 dramatic play The Winslow Boy
 Witch Hunt (1999) – Australian crime drama about a young girl who goes missing and her father who accuses his mother-in-law, Barbara of abducting her
 You Know My Name (1999) – made-for-television drama western film based on the real-life story of lawman and gunslinger Bill Tilghman

2000–present

See also 
 Docudrama
 List of films about the RMS Titanic
 List of historical drama films and series set in Near Eastern and Western civilization

References

External links 
 History at the Movies: Historical and Period Films
 Internet Movie Database list
 Films based on historical events and people

 
Actual events
Lists of historical films